The military history of Canada comprises hundreds of years of armed actions in the territory encompassing modern Canada, and interventions by the Canadian military in conflicts and peacekeeping worldwide. For thousands of years, the area that would become Canada was the site of sporadic intertribal conflicts among Aboriginal peoples. Beginning in the 17th and 18th centuries, Canada was the site of four colonial wars and two additional wars in Nova Scotia and Acadia between New France and New England; the conflicts spanned almost seventy years, as each allied with various First Nation groups.

In 1763, after the final colonial war—the Seven Years' War—the British emerged victorious and the French civilians, whom the British hoped to assimilate, were declared "British Subjects". After the passing of the Quebec Act in 1774, giving the Canadians their first charter of rights under the new regime, the northern colonies chose not to join the American Revolution and remained loyal to the British crown. The Americans launched invasions in 1775 and 1812. On both occasions, the Americans were rebuffed by Canadian forces; however, this threat would remain well into the 19th century and partially facilitated Canadian Confederation in 1867.

After Confederation, and amid much controversy, a full-fledged Canadian military was created. Canada, however, remained a British dominion, and Canadian forces joined their British counterparts in the Second Boer War and the First World War. While independence followed the Statute of Westminster, Canada's links to Britain remained strong, and the British once again had the support of Canadians during the Second World War. Since then, Canada has been committed to multilateralism and has gone to war within large multinational coalitions such as in the Korean War, the Gulf War, the Kosovo War, and the Afghan war.

Warfare in Pre-Columbian Canada  
Warfare existed in all regions and waxed in intensity, frequency and decisiveness. Indigenous societies waged war for economic and political reasons that include asserting their tribal independence, gaining access to resources and territory, exacting tribute, and gaining control of a trade route. Conflicts also occurred for personal and tribal honour—revenge for perceived wrongs committed against oneself or one's tribe. Before European colonization, indigenous warfare tended to be formal and ritualistic and entailed few casualties. Bow and arrow was the primary weapon used by Indigenous peoples in pre-Columbian Canada, with a warrior's archery skill having been honed by the intertwined role they have as hunters. Knives, hatchets/tomahawks and warclubs were also used for hand-to-hand combat. 

There is some evidence of much more violent warfare, even the complete genocide of some First Nations groups by others, such as the total displacement of the Dorset culture of Newfoundland by the Beothuk. As a result of conflict, several Algonquian and Iroquois societies lived in increasingly fortified villages made up of timber palisades at least  in height and with multiple layers of defences by 1000 CE. Warfare was also common among indigenous peoples of the Subarctic with sufficient population density. Inuit groups of the northern Arctic extremes generally did not engage in direct warfare, primarily because of their small populations, relying instead on traditional law to resolve conflicts.

Those captured in fights were not always killed; tribes often adopted captives to replace warriors lost during raids and battles, and captives were also used for prisoner exchanges. Slavery was hereditary, the slaves being prisoners of war and their descendants. Slavery was practiced among the indigenous peoples of the Pacific Northwest Coast, including the Tlingit and Haida. Approximately a quarter of the Indigenous population on the pacific northwest coast were slaves.

Before the French settlement of the St. Lawrence River valley, the local Iroquoian peoples were almost completely displaced, likely due to warfare with their neighbours the Algonquin. The Iroquois League was established before major European contact. Most archaeologists and anthropologists believe that the League was formed sometime between 1450 and 1600. These existing indigenous alliances became important to the colonial powers in the struggle for North American hegemony during the 17th and 18th centuries.

Post-European contact
The first conflicts between Europeans and indigenous peoples may have occurred around 1003 CE, when parties of Norsemen attempted to establish permanent settlements along the northeastern coast of North America (see L'Anse aux Meadows). According to Norse sagas, the Skrælings of Vinland responded so ferociously that the newcomers eventually withdrew and gave up their plans to settle the area.

After European arrival, fighting between indigenous groups tended to be bloodier and more decisive, especially as tribes became caught up in the economic and military rivalries of the European settlers. Firearms began to make their way into Indigenous hands in the early 17th century, with the large-scale acquisition beginning in the 1640s. By the end of the 17th century, Indigenous peoples of the Northeastern Woodlands, the eastern subarctic, and the Métis (a people of joint First Nations and European descent) had rapidly adopted the use of firearms, supplanting the bow. However, use of the bow and arrow continued until the early 18th century, as a covert weapon for surprise attacks. The adoption of firearms significantly increased the number of fatalities. The bloodshed during conflicts was also dramatically increased by the uneven distribution of firearms and horses among competing indigenous groups.

17th century 

Five years after the French founded Port-Royal in 1605, the English began their first settlement, at Cuper's Cove. La Salle's explorations had given France a claim to the Mississippi River valley, where fur trappers and a few colonists set up scattered settlements. The colonies of New France, Acadia on the Bay of Fundy and Canada on the St. Lawrence River, were based primarily on the fur trade and had only lukewarm support from the French monarchy. The colonies of New France grew slowly given the difficult geographical and climatic circumstances. By 1706, the French population was around 16,000. This lack of immigration resulted in New France having one-tenth of the population of the British Thirteen Colonies to the south of New France by the mid 1700s.

The more favourably located New England Colonies developed a diversified economy and flourished from immigration. Since 1670, the English also laid claim to Hudson Bay and its drainage basin (known as Rupert's Land) through the Hudson's Bay Company (HBC), as well as chartered several colonies and seasonal fishing settlements in Newfoundland Colony. To compensate against the larger British colonies, the French relied on Indigenous allies for military support. 

The early military of New France consisted of a mix of regular soldiers from the French Royal Army (like the Carignan-Salières Regiment) and French Navy (like the Troupes de la marine and Compagnies Franches de la Marine) supported by small local volunteer colonial militia. Although most troops in New France came from France, the growth of the colony meant by 1690, many were also volunteers from within New France. Additionally, many of the early troops and officers who were born in France remained in the colony after their service ended, contributing to generational service and a military elite. Localization efforts meant that by the 1750s, most troops were descendants of the original French inhabitants. Further units were developed from the seigneuries land systems. The French built a series of forts from Newfoundland to Louisiana and others captured from the British during the 1600s to 1760. Some were a mix of military post and trading forts.

Beaver Wars

The Beaver Wars (1609–1701) were a series of conflicts involving the Iroquois Confederacy, French colonial forces, and other First Nations. The conflict continued intermittently for nearly a century until the Great Peace of Montreal in 1701. By the 17th century, the economies of several First Nations had become interdependent with the European fur trade. The French, having only established the settlements of Port-Royal in 1605 and Quebec City in 1608, quickly joining pre-existing Indigenous alliances, most notably the Huron-Algonquin alliance, which brought them into conflict with the Iroquois Confederacy. While the majority of tribes in the region were allies of the French, the Iroquois had become aligned first with Dutch colonizers, and then the English. 

As a result of these trade relationships, the chief threat to the inhabitants of New France in its early existence came from the Iroquois Confederacy, and particularly from the easternmost Mohawks. To counter the Iroquois threat, the French government dispatched the Carignan-Salières Regiment, the first group of uniformed professional soldiers to set foot on what is today Canadian soil. Its members later formed the core of the Compagnies Franches de la Marine, the local militia. 

In early engagements, superior French firepower rapidly dispersed massed group of Iroquois. However, the Iroquois changed tactics by integrating their hunting skills and intimate knowledge of the terrain with new firearms acquired from their Dutch trading partners. The Iroquois fought a highly effective form of guerrilla warfare and were soon a significant threat to all but the handful of fortified cities. Furthermore, the French gave few guns to their Indigenous allies. By the mid-17th century, the Iroquois undertook campaigns to expand their territory to gain access to new hunting and trapping groups, having extirpated the beaver populations in their territory. Mohawk raids against the Algonquin in the Ottawa Valley were taking place by the 1630s, with Mohawk-Oneida raids against New French settlements taking place by early 1640s. Iroquois raids persisted and eventually resulted in the dispersal of Huron Confederacy, Neutral, and Petun. Hostilities temporarily ended when the French and Iroquois negotiated a peace in 1653.

The Iroquois Confederacy continued their expansionary campaigns in the mid-1650s, although the breakout of a wider front in 1659 and 1660 strained the confederacy, and resulted in another peace agreement between the French and their allies and the Iroquois in 1667. Sporadic fighting between the French and their allies and the Iroquois continued, with unsuccessful campaigns against one another being launched in 1684, 1687, and 1689. The latter raid in 1689 was conducted by the Iroquois in support of their English allies during the Nine Years' War. However, after Governor General Louis de Buade de Frontenac led a successful campaign against the Oneida and Onondaga in 1696, the weakened Iroquois opted to negotiate for peace with the French.

The Great Peace of Montreal was signed in 1701 between 39 First Nations, including the Iroquois Confederacy and First Nations allied with France. As a part of the peace terms, the Iroquois agreed to remain neutral in Anglo-French conflicts, in return for trade benefits from the French. These terms undermined the effectiveness of the Covenant Chain between the Iroquois and the English Crown, and the Iroquois' trading relationship with New England. Although the nations of the Iroquois Confederacy managed to expand their territories as a result of the conflict, the expansion did not bring about the prosperity originally envisioned.

Acadian Civil War 

In the mid-17th century, Acadia was plunged into what some historians have described as a civil war. After the death of Isaac de Razilly, the lieutenant governor of Acadia, in 1635, the French court divided Acadia into two administration. Charles de Menou d'Aulnay governed a portion of Acadia from Port-Royal, while Charles de Saint-Étienne de la Tour governed another portion from present-day Saint John, New Brunswick. However, the unclear divisions of administration between the two eventually led to conflict between the two governors.

There were four major battles during the conflict. La Tour attacked d'Aulnay at Port-Royal in 1640. In response to the attack, d'Aulnay establish a five-month blockade of La Tour's fort at Saint John, which La Tour eventually defeated in 1643. La Tour attacked d'Aulnay again at Port-Royal in 1643; During that time, d'Aulnay managed to gain the support of the French court, after he informed them that La Tour was seeking aid from English colonists in New England. Upon receiving word that La Tour had left Saint John to meet with supporters in New England, d'Aulney mobilized his forces and captured Saint John after besieging it in April 1645.

D'Aulney governed the entirety of Acadia since his death in May 1650. La Tour returned to France shortly after and restored his reputation and governorship over Acadia. La Tour governorship over Acadia lasted until 1654 when after years of civil war and decades of neglect from the French court, New England forces seized Acadia.

Anglo-Dutch Wars 

The Second Anglo-Dutch War (1665–1667) was a conflict between England and the Dutch Republic partly for control over the seas and trade routes.
In 1664, a year before the Second Anglo-Dutch War began, Michiel de Ruyter received instructions at Málaga on 1 September 1664 to cross the Atlantic to attack English shipping in the West Indies and at the Newfoundland fisheries in reprisal for Robert Holmes capturing several Dutch West India Company trading posts and ships on the West African coast. Sailing north from Martinique in June 1665, De Ruyter proceeded to Newfoundland, capturing English merchant ships and taking the town of St. John's before returning to Europe. As a result of the peace treaty that ended the Second Anglo-Dutch War, the English returned the colony of Acadia to the French, which was seized over a decade earlier in 1654.

During the Third Anglo-Dutch War (1672–1674), the inhabitants of St. John's fended off a second Dutch attack in 1673. The city was defended by Christopher Martin, an English merchant captain. Martin landed six cannons from his vessel, Elias Andrews, and constructed an earthen breastwork and battery near Chain Rock commanding the Narrows leading into the harbour.

King William's War 

English and French forces engaged one another in North America during the Nine Years' War (1688–1697), with the North American theatre of the conflict known as King William's War. At the onset of the war, Governor General Frontenac planned an invasion to conquer the Province of New York to isolate the Iroquois. However, the scale of the plan was later reduced. In February 1690, three New French-First Nations military expeditions were sent to New England. One expedition attacked Schenectady, another raided Salmon Falls, while a third besieged Fort Loyal. New France also encouraged its First Nations allies to carry out smaller raids throughout the English American frontier, and encouraged scalping as a form of psychological warfare. 

Having faced several attacks by New France's petite guerre, the English launched two retalitory expeditions against New France. The first was a large naval expedition sent to capture Quebec City in 1690. The expedition was poorly organized and had little time to achieve its objective, having arrived in mid-October, shortly before St. Lawrence would freeze over. The English forces withdrew after a single abortive landing on the Beauport shore to the east of Quebec City. The second English expedition took place in 1691, although they were repulsed at the Battle of La Prairie.  Other English attacks in Acadia include the Battle of Chedabucto, the Battle of Port Royal, the raid on Chignecto, and the siege of Fort Nashwaak.

Pierre Le Moyne d'Iberville was called upon to attack the English fishing stations in Newfoundland in the Avalon Peninsula campaign, and to expel the English from the island. Iberville sailed with his three vessels to Plaisance, the French capital of Newfoundland, before setting fire to St John's in November 1696. The expedition subsequently destroyed most of the English fisheries along the eastern shore of Newfoundland, while smaller raiding parties razed and looted remote English hamlets and seized prisoners. By the end of March 1697, only Bonavista and Carbonear remained in English hands. In four months of raids, Iberville destroyed 36 settlements.

Near the end of the war, the French were also able to secure their control over Hudsons Bay. The French had already seized several Hudson's Bay Company forts in an expedition before the war, with the HBC only holding one remaining fort on the bay, York Factory. Three expeditions were launched to capture York Factory, with the first ending failure in 1690. The second expedition captured York Factory in 1694, although it was recaptured by the English months later. York Factory was finally secured by the French after the Battle of Hudson's Bay in 1697. 

The war ended in 1697 with the Peace of Ryswick, which required all territorial conquests made during the war to be returned. The HBC was also forced to relinquish all but one fort on Hudson Bay (Fort Albany). The resulting peace saw both the English and French consolidate alliances and trade relations with Indigenous peoples in the area. The Peace of Ryswick also contributed to the eventually negotiated peace of the Beaver Wars in 1701.

English-martime Algonquians conflict
The English-French conflict merged with a preexisting conflict between the English and the maritime Algonquians; which began shortly before King William's War when the Algonquians attacked several English settlements in response to their encroachment on their territory. The French successfully leverage Anglo-Indigenous hostilities to their advantage, partly due to the influence of French missionaries and settlers living in Indigenous villages. Peace talks were held in 1693 between the English and maritime Algonquians. However, these talks were sabotaged by the French, who induced their Indigenous allies to continue fighting. The French also encouraged the Abenaki and Mi’kmaq to engage in privateering, with many serving as buccaneers in the French Navy. These privateers took part in the naval battle off St. John and the second siege of Pemaquid in 1696.

18th century 

During the 18th century, the British–French struggle in Canada intensified as the rivalry worsened in Europe. The French government increased its military spending into its North American colonies. Expensive garrisons were maintained at distant fur trading posts, the fortifications of Quebec City were improved and augmented, and a new fortified town was built on the east coast of Île Royale, the fortress of Louisbourg, called "Gibraltar of the North" or the "Dunkirk of America".

New France and the New England Colonies were at war with one another three times during the 18th century. The second and third colonial wars, Queen Anne's War and King George's War, were local offshoots of larger European conflicts—the War of the Spanish Succession (1702–13), the War of the Austrian Succession (1744–48). The last, the French and Indian War, started in the Ohio Valley, that later evolved into a theatre of the Seven Years' War. The petite guerre of the Canadiens devastated the northern towns and villages of New England, sometimes reaching as far south as Virginia. The war also spread to the forts along the Hudson Bay shore. In addition to spillovers of European conflicts, the French also participated in Indigenous conflicts like the Fox Wars.

Queen Anne's War 

Hostilities between the British and the French broke out during the War of Spanish Succession, with the conflict spilling over to their North American colonies. The North American theatre of the conflict, Queen Anne's War (1702–1713), was largely restricted to Acadia and New England, as both the colonies of Canada and New York agreed to informally remain neutral during the conflict. Initially, the French-aligned Abenaki also declared their neutrality in the Anglo-French conflict. However, the English immediately declared hostilities against the Abenaki, drawing them into the conflict as well. 

The war saw Acadians and New Englanders conduct raids against one another. Raids that occurred in Acadia include the raid on Grand Pré in 1704 and the Battle of Bloody Creek in 1711. The raid on Grand Pré was conducted by New England forces in retaliation against a New French-First Nations raid on Deerfield in the British Province of Massachusetts Bay. Other French-First Nations raids in Massachusetts include the raid on Haverhill. The French also attacked Newfoundland, besieging St. John's in 1705, and captured the city after a battle in 1709. However, the French suffered a major setback after the British captured the Acadian capital of Port-Royal. The capital was besieged three times during the conflict, having repelled two sieges in 1707 before falling to the British during the third siege of Port-Royal in 1710. Following up on its success in Acadia, in 1711, the British launched the Quebec Expedition to take the colonial capital of New France. However, the expedition was aborted after its fleet was wrecked by the waters of the St. Lawrence River. 

In the ensuing Peace of Utrecht, the French were forced to cede significant territory in North America. This included restoring the lands surrounding Hudson's Bay to the HBC and ceding its claims to Newfoundland and Acadia, although it was granted fishing rights off parts of Newfoundland. However, because of a difference in interpretation over the size of Acadia, the French continued to occupy the western portion of the territory (present-day New Brunswick). The French also continued its relationship with the Abenaki and Mi'kmaq in Acadia and encouraged them to attack the British. After the conflict, the French built the Fortress of Louisbourg to protect its remaining Acadian settlements on Île-Royale and Île Saint-Jean, while the British quickly built new outposts to secure its Acadian holdings.

Father Rale's War

Hostilities between the maritime Algonquians and the British continued after Queen's Anne War, with the Mi’kmaq capturing 40 British vessels between 1715 to 1722. In May 1722 Lieutenant Governor John Doucett took 22 Mi'kmaq hostages at Annapolis Royal to prevent the capital from being attacked. In July 1722, the Abenaki and Mi'kmaq created a blockade of Annapolis Royal with the intent of starving the capital.  As a result of the escalating conflict, Massachusetts Governor Samuel Shute officially declared war on the Abenaki on July 22, 1722. Early operations of Father Rale's War happened in the Nova Scotia theatre. In July 1724, a group of 60 Mi'kmaq and Maliseets raided Annapolis Royal.

The treaty that ended the war marked a significant shift in European relations with the maritime Algonquians. It granted the British the right to settle in traditional Abenaki and Mi'kmaq lands. However, the treaty also marked the first time a European power formally acknowledged that its dominion over Nova Scotia had to be negotiated with the region's indigenous inhabitants. The treaty was invoked as recently as 1999 in the Donald Marshall case.

King George's War 

British and French forces engaged one another during the War of Austrian Succession, with the North American theatre of the conflict known as King George's War (1744–1748). Although the maritime Algonquians quickly joined the French war effort, many of New France's Indigenous allies in the Great Lakes region were hesitant to join the war, as they wished to maintain their trade relations with the British. The British established these trade relations in the decades before the war, as a deliberate effort to destabilize the Franco-Indigenous alliances in that region.  

Throughout the war, Acadians and Canadiens raided frontier settlements in Nova Scotia, New England, and New York. Raids that occurred in Nova Scotia includes the raid on Canso, siege of Annapolis Royal, and the Battle of Grand Pré. French-Mohawk raids into New England and New York includes the raid on Saratoga and the siege of Fort Massachusetts. However, the Mohawk were unwilling to join the French excursions deeper into New York, for fear of coming into conflict with other members of the Iroquois Confederacy.

In 1745, a British-New England force besieiged and captured Louisbourg. However, the British were not able to advance further into New France, with the French repelling a British attack on Île Saint-Jean at the Battle at Port-la-Joye in 1746. However, the capture of Louisbourg was instrumental in damaging Franco-Indigenous alliances in the Great Lakes region, as it effectively cut off Quebec City from France and brought trade to a standstill in the Great Lakes. As a result, the price of goods skyrocketed and the French were unable to continue its annual gifts to secure its Indigenous alliances. Although many Indigenous communities in the Great Lakes were initially sympathetic to the French war effort, this sudden change was viewed by some of France's Indigenous allies as a violation of their alliance; with some Indigenous communities becoming hostile to the French in the latter part of the war. In 1746, the French launched the Duc d'Anville expedition, the largest military expedition to set sail from Europe for the Americas up to that point, to recapture Louisbourg. However, it ended in failure, as it was beset by bad weather, and many of its troops had fallen ill before arriving to Nova Scotia. 

The Treaty of Aix-la-Chapelle ended the war in 1748, and returned control of Louisbourg to the French in exchange for some of its wartime territorial gains in the Low Countries and India. The return of Louisbourg to the French outraged New Englanders. In response to the continued French presence around Nova Scotia, the British founded the military settlement of Halifax, and built Citadel Hill in 1749.

Father Le Loutre's War 

Father Le Loutre's War (1749–1755) was fought in Acadia and Nova Scotia by the British and New Englanders, primarily under the leadership of New England ranger John Gorham and the British officer Charles Lawrence, against the Mi'kmaq and Acadians, who were led by French priest Jean-Louis Le Loutre. After the British established Halifax, the Acadians and Mi'kmaq orchestrated attacks at Chignecto, Grand-Pré, Dartmouth, Canso, Halifax and Country Harbour. The French erected forts at present-day Saint John, Chignecto and Fort Gaspareaux. The British responded by attacking the Mi'kmaq and Acadians at Mirligueche (later known as Lunenburg), Chignecto and St. Croix. The British also established communities in Lunenburg and Lawrencetown. Finally, the British erected forts in Acadian communities at Windsor, Grand-Pré and Chignecto.

Throughout the war, the Mi’kmaq and Acadians attacked the British fortifications of Nova Scotia and the newly established Protestant settlements. They wanted to retard British settlement and buy time for France to implement its Acadian resettlement scheme. The war ended after six years with the defeat of the Mi'kmaq, Acadians and French in the Battle of Fort Beauséjour. During this war, Atlantic Canada witnessed more population movements, more fortification construction, and more troop allocations than ever before in the region. The Acadians and Mi'kmaq left Nova Scotia during the Acadian Exodus for the French colonies of Île Saint-Jean and Île Royale.

Seven Years' War 

The final conflict of the French and Indian Wars was the Seven Years' War. Although France and the Great Britain were not formally at war until 1756, hostilities between their colonial forces broke out in North America in 1754, in a theatre known as the French and Indian War (1754–1760). Overlapping claims over the Ohio Country between the British and French led the French to build a series of forts near the area in 1753. This in turn led to the breakout of hostilities between the British and French colonies the next year. Most First Nations were quick to lend their support to the French, as many held a negative perception of the British due to their territorial policies in the preceding years. In turn, throughout the war, the British worked to undermine the Franco-Indigenous alliances by encouraging Indigenous neutrality through Iroquois intermediaries. The Iroquois Confederacy itself entered the conflict on the British side at the Battle of Fort Niagara in 1759.

Early French success and Acadia

In 1754, the British planned a four-pronged attack against New France, with attacks planned against Fort Niagara on the Niagara River, Fort Saint-Frédéric on Lake Champlain, Fort Duquesne on the Ohio River, and Fort Beauséjour at the border of French-held Acadia. However, the plan fell apart after the armies sent to capture Niagara and Saint-Frédéric abandoned their campaigns, and the Braddock Expedition sent to capture Fort Duquesne was defeated by a New French-First Nations forces at the Battle of the Monongahela. Although most of the plan had failed, the army sent to Acadia was successful at the Battle of Fort Beauséjour. Following their victory at Beauséjour, the British moved to assert their control over the region, and began to forcibly relocate the majority of the Acadian population from Acadia, beginning with the Bay of Fundy campaign in 1755. The relocations took place to neutralize the Acadian's potential military threat, and to interrupt the vital supply lines to Louisbourg. Throughout the war, over 12,000 Acadians were removed from Acadia.

In 1756, shortly after a formal state of war was declared between the British and French, the French commander-in-chief of New France, Pierre de Rigaud, marquis de Vaudreuil-Cavagnial, created a military strategy aimed at keeping the British on the defensive and far away from the populated part of New France, the colony of Canada. To achieve this, the military of New France undertook a series of offensive operations, including the Battle of Fort Oswego and the siege of Fort William Henry, while Canadian militia and First Nations raiding parties were dispatched against frontier settlements in British America. The use of a small French army, aided by militiamen and First Nations allies successfully tied down British forces to their colonial frontier and forced the British to send 20,000 more soldiers to reinforce its North American colonies. Although the French experienced early success, they were unable to build upon it — as the majority of their army was already committed to the European theatre of the war and were unable to reinforce New France.

British conquest of New France

In 1758, the British launched a new offensive against New France. An initial invasion force of 15,000 soldiers was repelled at the Battle of Carillon, by a force of 3,800 French regulars and militiamen. However, the French suffered several major setbacks in the following months, with the British capturing Louisbourg after a month-long siege of the fortress in June–July 1758, and the British destroying the French supply stock for its western posts at the Battle of Fort Frontenac in August 1758. During that time, the French were also forced to retreat from Fort Duquesne, after some of their First Nations allies established a separate peace agreement with the British.

The British launched three campaigns against New France in 1758. The first two campaigns targeted Niagara and Lake Champlain, while the third targeted Quebec City. After the French successfully confronted the latter invasion force at the Battle of Beauport in July, the British commander, Major-General James Wolfe opted to besiege Quebec City. 
The three-month siege culminated with the Battle of the Plains of Abraham, in which the French general, Louis-Joseph de Montcalm, marched out of the walls of Quebec City with a numerically inferior force to fight the British the battlefield. The French were subsequently defeated, with both Wolfe and Montcalm having been killed as a result of the battle.  

After Montcalm's death, command of the French Army was handed to François Gaston de Lévis. In April 1760, de Lévis launched a new campaign to retake Quebec City. After de Lévis defeated the British at the Battle of Sainte-Foy, the British fell back to the walls of Quebec City as Lévis besieged the city. The French siege was lifted in May after a British naval force defeated a French naval element supporting the siege at the Battle of Pointe-aux-Trembles. With the arrival of the British Royal Navy, New France was virtually isolated from France and could not be reinforced. As a result, the remaining French Army retired to Montreal, and on 8 September 1760, signed the Articles of Capitulation of Montreal. The capitulation marked the completion of the British conquest of New France and the end of the North American theatre of the Seven Years' War. The British made peace with the Seven Nations of Canada a week later. France's maritime Algonquian allies made peace with the British in 1761.

British naval power was a deciding factor in the outcome of the war, playing a crucial role in the capture of Louisbourg and Quebec City, and preventing French reinforcements from reaching the colony. As a result, the French were forced to cede large swathes of territory in the Treaty of Paris of 1763, most notably New France. Although the British were victorious, the war also provided the British with a colossal national debt. The absence of the French military in North America had also emboldened residents of the Thirteen Colonies, who no longer needed to rely on the British for military protection.

Pontiac's War

Although the Seven Years' War ended, rumours of a First Nations offensive in the British frontier persisted in 1763. An alliance of First Nations under Odawa chief Pontiac was formed to drive the British from the Great Lakes and Ohio Country and were later forced to lay siege to Fort Detroit when the British were alerted of their activities. The siege prompted other First Nations aligned with Odawa to attack other British forts and settlements in the region. During the conflict, the British raised a volunteer battalion of 300 French Canadians led by former Troupes de la Marines, and were dispatched to Fort Detroit as a part of Brigadier-General John Bradstreet's expedition. Although First Nations were successful in several engagements during the conflict, Pontiac's failure to capture Fort Detroit undermined his prestige, and the resistance eventually dissipated. Peace was eventually concluded with the restoration of the traditional distribution of presents, as well as the issuance of the Royal Proclamation of 1763. The proclamation established the Province of Quebec and the Indian Reserve, as well as providing First Nations with several land rights. As a result of the conflict, the British found themselves effectively fulfilling the role previously occupied by France, as an obstacle against the expansion of the Thirteen Colonies.

American Revolutionary War 

After the Seven Years' War, Britain's American colonies became restive over the payment of taxes to support a large military presence for a French enemy no longer there, as well as other taxes imposed by the British Parliament. American frustrations were further exacerbated after the Quebec Act was passed in 1774, and restored French Catholic rights in the Province of Quebec, much to the ire of the anti-Catholic Protestant-based Thirteen Colonies. The act had also enlarged Quebec to include the unsettled lands of the Ohio Country, territories that the British colonies of Pennsylvannia and Virginia had long coveted. These tensions led to a political revolution in the Thirteen Colonies, and eventually, the American Revolutionary War (1775–1776), with American rebels aiming to break free from the British parliament, and to assert its claim in the Ohio Country.

At the onset of war, the majority of the common people in Quebec and the Maritime colonies were neutral and reluctant to take up arms against the Americans or the British. Revolutionaries launched a propaganda campaign in the Canadian colonies early in the war to elicit support, although it only attracted limited support. Similarly, the British saw limited success in raising a militia to defend Quebec, although they were able to rely on the French Canadian clergy, landowners, and other leading citizens for support. The British were also supported by the Seven Nations of Canada and the Iroquois Confederacy, although the latter attempted to maintain its neutrality due to an ongoing civil war within their confederacy. 

In September 1775, the Americans launched their first offensive operation, the invasion of Quebec, with the capture of Fort Ticonderoga and the siege of Fort St. Jean. The latter siege, which took place outside Montreal, prompted the governor of Quebec, Guy Carleton, to abandon Montreal and flee to Quebec City. The American army advanced towards Quebec City and met up with Benedict Arnold's expedition outside the city. On New Year's Eve, the combined American force attacked Quebec City, although it was repulsed. After the failed assault, the Americans maintained a siege against the city until spring 1776, when the besieging force was routed by a British naval force sent to relieve Quebec. The Americans abandoned Montreal shortly afterwards, and its remaining forces in Quebec were defeated at the Battle of Trois-Rivières in June 1776. British forces under General John Burgoyne pursued the Americans out of Quebec in a counter-invasion against New York. 

Although the Canadien militia constituted most of Quebec City's defenders during the invasion, it saw little expeditionary action outside Quebec; with the British uncertain if the militia would remain loyal if they encountered the French Royal Army. However, several British colonial auxiliary units were raised in the Canadian colonies, like the Royal Fencible American Regiment and the 84th Regiment of Foot. The latter served throughout the Canadian colonies and the Thirteen Colonies. From 1778 to the war's end, British First Nations allies under Thayendanegea also conducted a series against New York border settlements.

New Englanders also attacked Nova Scotia in the hopes of sparking a revolt there, although they were defeated at the battles of Fort Cumberland in 1776 and St. John in 1777. Although the revolutionaries were unable to spark a revolt, Nova Scotia remained a target of American privateering throughout the war, with nearly every important coastal outpost having been attacked. Attacks like the 1782 raid on Lunenburg had a devastating effect on the colony's coastal maritime economy. In total, American privateers captured 225 vessels either leaving or arriving at a Nova Scotian ports. The French Navy also attacked a British naval convoy off Nova Scotia, during the Action of 21 July 1781. Conversely, the British captured numerous American privateers off the coast of Nova Scotia, like the battle off Halifax in 1782, and used the colony as a staging ground to launch attacks against New England, like the Battle of Machias.

The revolutionaries' failure to capture the Canadian colonies and the continued allegiance to Britain from its colonists resulted in the breakup of Britain's North American empire. Although the British successfully defended Quebec and Nova Scotia, their military failures in the Thirteen Colonies resulted in their military surrender in 1781, and the subsequent recognition of the independent US republic in the Treaty of Paris. The emergence of a powerful neighbour fuelled suspicions in the Canadian colonies against the US for decades. Over 80,000 Americans who remained loyal to the Crown, known as the United Empire Loyalists, moved north to the remaining portions of British North America. The influx of Loyalists expanded the English-speaking population in the Quebec and transformed the politics of British North America. As the Iroquois' traditional territory was ceded by the British to the Americans in the peace, the British offered the Iroquois land in Quebec, hoping these new Iroquois communities would provide an active barrier against American expansion.

French Revolutionary Wars

In 1796, during the War of the First Coalition, a series of fleet manoeuvres and amphibious landings took place in Newfoundland. The French expedition included seven ships of the line and three frigates under Rear-Admiral Joseph de Richery. The French were accompanied by a Spanish squadron of 10 ships of the line under General Jose Solano y Bote. The combined fleet sailed from Rota, Spain, with the Spanish squadron accompanying the French to ward off the British squadron that blockaded the French in the city earlier that year. The Newfoundland expedition was the last portion of Richery's expedition before he returned to France. Sighting of the combined naval squadron prompted defensives to be prepared at St. John's, Newfoundland in August 1796. Seeing these defences, Richery opted to not attack the defended capital, instead moving south to raid the undefended settlements, fishing stations and vessels, and a garrison base at Placentia Bay. After the raids on Newfoundland, the squadron was split up, with half moving on to raid neighbouring Saint Pierre and Miquelon, while the other half moved to intercept the seasonal fishing fleets off the coast of Labrador.

19th century

War of 1812 

Animosity and suspicion persisted between the UK and the US in the decades after the American Revolution. The Napoleonic War exacerbated Anglo-American tensions, as British wartime measures against France aggravated the US. Such policies include trade restrictions imposed on neutral ships to France, and the impressment of sailors from American vessels the British claimed were deserters. As the US was not in possession of a navy capable of challenging the Royal Navy, an invasion of Canada was proposed as a feasible means of attacking the British. Americans on the western frontier also hoped an invasion would bring an end to British support of Indigenous resistance in the American Northwest Territory. Intrigued by Major General Henry Dearborn's the analysis that the invasion would be easy, and supported by the congressional war hawks, US President James Madison declared war against the UK in June 1812, beginning the War of 1812 (1812–1815).

American war plans focused on the province of Upper Canada due to its light defences, and because the Maritimes colonies were too well defended by the Royal Navy and Lower Canada by its remoteness and fortifications in Quebec City. However, some prewar preparations were made in Upper Canada due to the foresight of its lieutenant general, Major-General Isaac Brock. At the onset of the war, Upper Canada was defended by 1,600 regulars, allied First Nations, and several Canadian units raised for the war like the Provincial Marine, Fencibles, and militia units like Captain Runchey's Company of Coloured Men. 

Believing a bold attack was needed to galvanize the local population and First Nations to defend the colony, Brock quickly organized a British-First Nations siege on Fort Mackinac. In August 1812, a force under Brock moved towards Amherstburg to repel an American army that had crossed into Upper Canada, although the Americans had retreated to Detroit by the time Brock arrived. Their retreat allowed Brock to secure an alliance with Shawnee chief Tecumseh, and provided him with an excuse to abandon his previous orders to maintain a defensive posture within Upper Canada. Detroit was then besieged and captured by a British-First Nations force, providing them control over the Michigan Territory and the Upper Mississippi. In October 1812, a British-First Nations force repelled another American army that had crossed over from the Niagara River at the Battle of Queenston Heights, although the following battle resulted in the death of Brock. A third American army assembled to retake Detroit in late 1812, although after it was defeated at the Battle of Frenchtown in January 1813, ending the threat of any further American attacks that winter.

Although Brock's offensives led to early success, his death resulted in a shift in British strategy, with Governor George Prevost maintaining a more defensive posture to conserve his forces. As a result, the British maintained their strongest garrisons in Lower Canada, and only reinforced Upper Canada when additional troops arrived from overseas.

1813

Unlike in 1812, the US had better success with its initial campaigns in 1813. In April, the Americans briefly occupied and razed parts of the Upper Canadian capital of York after Battle of York. The American naval force that captured York later moved onto Fort George and captured it on 27 May. However, as the retreating British were not immediately pursued, they were able to regroup and eventually defeat the American force sent against them at the battles of Stoney Creek and Beaver Dams. The American force fell back across the Niagara River in December, after setting Fort George and Newark ablaze. In retaliation, the British razed much of Buffalo several weeks later at the Battle of Buffalo, and continued such reprisals until the burning of Washington in 1814. 

Although the British were successful in defending the Niagara Peninsula in 1813, they saw several major setbacks in the western frontier that year. The British-First Nations siege of Fort Meigs in the spring failed as the force was unable to secure the American stronghold, and in September, the British had lost control over the Upper Great Lakes after the Battle of Lake Erie. After the naval loss at Lake Erie, the British-First Nations forces in the American Northwest Territory were forced to retreat, although they were pursued and eventually routed at the Battle of Moraviantown. The battle resulted in the death of First Nations leader Tecumseh, which effectively dissolved Tecumseh's confederacy and the alliance with the British. However, the US were unable to follow up on this victory, as the Americans militiamen that pursued the British-First Nations force to Moraviantown needed to return to their farms for harvest.

In late 1813, the Americans also sent two armies to invade Lower Canada. A British-First Nations force turned back a larger American force at the Battle of the Chateauguay in October 1813. The next month, a British force repelled another American army during the Battle of Crysler's Farm.

1814
The last incursions into the Canadas occurred in 1814 when the Americans crossed over the Niagara River and captured Fort Erie. The American advance culminated in the Battle of Lundy's Lane. Although the battle ended in a stalemate, the American force was effectively spent and was forced to retire to Fort Erie. The Americans successfully repelled the British siege of Fort Erie, although the exhausted Americans retreated to the US shortly afterwards, effectively ending the conflict in the Canadas.

The British regained the initiative in the war in 1814, and reclaimed control of Lake Huron after several engagements on the lake. As the War of the Sixth Coalition drew to a close, the British began to reorient its focus on its war with the US. Lower Canada and Nova Scotia were used as staging grounds for invasions. The force that gathered in Lower Canada invaded northern New York, although they were repulsed by the Americans at the Battle of Plattsburgh in September. The force that assembled in Halifax was more successful in its campaign, capturing most of Maine's coastline by mid-September.

Throughout the war, communities in Nova Scotia purchased or built a variety of privateer ships to attack US shipping. The Liverpool Packet was a notable privateering vessel from Liverpool, Nova Scotia, credited with having captured fifty ships during the war. American naval prisoners of war, including the captives from the capture of USS Chesapeake, were imprisoned at Deadman's Island, Halifax.

The Treaty of Ghent was signed on 24 December 1814, ending the conflict and restoring the status quo between the US and the UK. However, American and British units that had not received news of the peace continued to fight for several weeks after. The war helped provide the Canadian colonies with a sense of community and laid the groundwork for Canada's future nationhood. Neither side of the war can claim total victory, as neither had completely achieved their war aims. However, historians agree that the First Nations were the "losers" of the conflict, given  the collapse of the Tecumseh's confederacy after his death in 1813, and the British dropping its proposal for an First Nations buffer state in the midwestern US during the peace negotiations.

Pemmican War

In 1812, the Red River Colony was established by the Hudson's Bay Company, despite opposition from the North West Company (NWC), which had already operated a trading post in the area, Fort Gibraltar. In January 1814, the Pemmican Proclamation was issued by the Red River Colony, prohibiting the export of pemmican and other provisions from the colony for a year to ensure the its survival and growth. The ban was opposed by the NWC and Métis voyageurs that lived in the area and regularly traded with the NWC, viewing the proclamation as a ploy by the HBC to control the foodstuff of NWC traders.

In June 1815, Metis leader and NWC clerk Cuthbert Grant established a camp with his followers south of the colony and began to harass the settlement and steal their equipment. This in turn led to the occasional exchange of gunfire. In response, HBC seized Fort Gibraltar from the NWC in March 1816, to prevent the movement of pemmican from the colony. In June 1816, HBC officials confronted Métis and First Nations voyageurs delivering pemmicans to the NWC, which resulted in the brief Battle of Seven Oaks. After the confrontation, Grant briefly took control of the area, while the HBC and its settlers temporarily retreated to Norway House. HBC's control over the area was restored when Thomas Douglas, 5th Earl of Selkirk arrived in August with 90 soldiers.

British forces in Canada in the mid–19th century
Fear of an American invasion of Canada remained a serious concern for at least the next half-century and was the chief reason for the retention of a large British garrison in the colony. 

From the 1820s to the 1840s, the British undertook extensive construction of fortifications to create strong points around which defending forces might centre in the event of an American invasion, like the Citadel of Quebec in Quebec City, Fort Henry in Kingston, and the reconstruction of Citadel Hill in Halifax. The Rideau Canal was also built to allow ships in wartime to travel a more northerly route from Montreal to Kingston. The customary peacetime route was the St. Lawrence River, which constituted the northern edge of the American border, and made it vulnerable to American attack and interference.

However, by the 1850s, fears of an American invasion had begun to diminish, and the British felt able to start reducing the size of their garrison. The Reciprocity Treaty, negotiated between Canada and the US in 1854, further helped to alleviate concerns.

Local levies and recruitment

In the 19th century, the British Army levied and recruited from the local population of British North America to form new units or to replace individuals lost to enemy action, sickness, or desertion. Instances where the British levied from the local population to serve as Fencibles or in the Canadian militia, include the War of 1812, the Rebellions of 1837, the Fenian Raids in 1866, and the Wolseley expedition in 1870. The British Army also raised several regular infantry regiments in their Canadian colonies including the 40th Regiment of Foot, the 100th (Prince of Wales's Royal Canadian) Regiment of Foot, and the Royal Canadian Rifle Regiment.

Several Canadians fought in the Crimean War as members of the British military, with the Welsford-Parker Monument in Halifax being the only Crimean War monument in North America. The first Canadian Victoria Cross recipient, Alexander Roberts Dunn, was awarded the medal for his actions during the Charge of the Light Brigade. During the Indian Rebellion of 1857, William Nelson Hall, a descendant of former American slaves from Maryland, was the first black Canadian and first black Nova Scotian, to receive the Victoria Cross. He received the medal for his actions in the Siege of Lucknow.

Rebellions of 1837–1838 

Two armed uprisings broke out from 1837 to 1838 in the Canadas. Calls for responsible government, and an economic depression in Lower Canada in the 1830s led to protest rallies and eventually, calls for armed insurrection from the more radical Patriote movement. An uprising eventually broke out in Lower Canada in November 1837 and was the more serious and violent insurgency of the Rebellions of 1837–1838. The second armed rising in the Canadas broke out several weeks after the initial uprising in Lower Canada, with its leaders being inspired by the events in Lower Canada.

The first insurrection in Lower Canada broke out in November 1837. British regulars and the Canadian militia fought Patriote rebels in a series of skirmishes including the Battle of Saint-Denis, Battle of Saint-Charles,  and the Battle of Saint-Eustache. The disorganized rebels were defeated, although its leadership escaped to the US. Amid this initial defeat, several anglophone militias looted and burned French-Canadian settlements. A second uprising in Lower Canada was launched in November 1838 with the assistance of American volunteers. However, like the first uprising, it was poorly organized and quickly put down. During the Lower Canada Rebellion, 325 people died, the majority of whom were rebels. The British recorded only 27 dead.

The Upper Canada Rebellion was led by William Lyon Mackenzie. Mackenzie's followers were made up primarily of farmers of American origin, who were disgruntled over the preferential treatment given to British settlers in the colony's land grant system. The first confrontation took place at the Battle of Montgomery's Tavern in Toronto on 5 December 1837. Most rebels fled after the confrontation, although the remaining rebel group was only dispersed three days later, when Loyalists and Black Loyalists arrived at the tavern. On 14 January, Mackenzie seized Navy Island and declared it the Republic of Canada, although he was forced to flee to the US after Canadian volunteers burned the rebel ship Caroline. Three people died during the Upper Canada Rebellion, two rebels and one loyalist. For the rest of 1838, Mackenzie's followers and sympathizers from the US conducted a series of raids against Upper Canada known as the Patriot War.

The rebellions prompted the creation of the Durham Report, which recommended uniting the Canadas. Upper and Lower Canada were united to form the Province of Canada after the Act of Union 1840 was proclaimed in 1841; which in turn led to the introduction of responsible government in 1848.

Fraser Canyon Gold Rush conflicts
The influx of gold prospectors into the Fraser Canyon during the Fraser Canyon Gold Rush resulted in several conflicts between the prospectors and the First Nations in the region. An early conflict at the onset of the gold rush was the Fraser Canyon War in 1858 when the Nlaka’pamux made several attacks against the newly arrived American prospectors to defend their territory. In response, the prospectors formed military companies to carry out reprisals against Nlakaʼpamux. Responding to the violence, the British formed the colony of British Columbia on 2 August, and sent gunboats to the Fraser River to reestablish order. However, as British military capabilities were limited on the Pacific coast, they were unable to quickly assert control and open war broke out on 9 August. A truce was reached between the two sides after a peace council was held on 21 August. A British contingent arrived at the end of the month to secure the area. Approximately 36 Nlakaʼpamux died during the conflict, including five chiefs.

Another conflict broke out in April 1864, known as the Chilcotin War. In that month, the Tsilhqot’in killed 21 prospectors and construction workers that had crossed into their territory. These attacks led to a month-long armed standoff in the British Columbia Interior after an armed group, made up mostly of newly arrived American prospectors, marched out from the colonial capital of New Westminster to put down the resistance in the Crown's name. The conflict ended after a Tsilhqot’in peace delegation was mistakenly arrested. Six members of the delegation were convicted and hanged for murder, having participated in the attacks. The Tsilhqot’in maintained their actions were an act of war and not murder. In 2018, the Canadian government exonerated the six individuals and issued an apology to the Tsilhqot'in, recognizing "that they acted in accordance with their laws and traditions" for war.

American Civil War

The British Empire declared neutrality in the American Civil War (1861–1865) at its onset. However, despite this official stance, the colonies of British North America sold weapons to both sides of the war. Although some colonial newspapers sympathized with the Confederate States of America, as its victory aligned with colonial "security interests", the large majority of the 40,000 Canadians who volunteered to fight in the American Civil War did so with the Union Army. Most Canadian combatants were volunteers, although some Canadians were bribed or tricked into service by American recruiters or "crimpers". By the end of the war, 29 Canadian Union Army officers were awarded the Medal of Honor.

Although the Empire was neutral, several incidents during the conflict, like the Trent affair and the Chesapeake affair, resulted in the deterioration of Anglo-American relations. The former was the most serious incident to take place, occurring in 1861 after a US gunboat stopped the RMS Trent to remove two Confederate officials bound for Britain. The British demanded an apology and the release of the passengers. War appeared imminent in the months after the incident, with the British taking steps to reinforce its North American garrison from a strength of 4,000 to 18,000. However, the crisis subsided after an apology was issued.

When the Union Army regained the initiative in 1863, Confederate President Jefferson Davis dispatched Jacob Thompson to create a new front from Canada. Thompson set up a base in Montreal and Toronto and planned raids to free Confederates from prison camps and attack Union ships in the Great Lakes. In 1864, Confederate raiders from Montreal launched the St. Albans Raid in Vermont, although they were quickly chased back by local defenders to the Canadian border, where the British subsequently intervened and arrested the Confederates.

Fenian raids 

In the mid-1860s, Irish republicans of the Fenian Brotherhood had voiced support for raiding British North America. Most Fenians were Irish-American veterans of the Union Army, who believed that by seizing parts of British North America, they can coerce the British to accept Irish independence. The Fenians had also incorrectly assumed that Irish Canadians would support their invasive efforts both politically and militarily. However, most Irish settlers in Canada West at that time were Protestants of mostly either Anglo-Irish or Ulster-Scots descent, and for the most part loyal to the Crown. Nonetheless, the threat was significant enough that in 1865, British and Canadian agents in the US were directed to shift their focus from Confederate sympathizers to the Fenians. After it became clear the Fenians were planning an attack, 10,000 volunteers of the Canadian militia were mobilized in 1866. The number of mobilized troops was later raised to 14,000, then 20,000. The militia also patrolled the Great Lakes and St. Lawrence River with 13 small steamboats.

The first raid occurred in April 1866, when Fenians landed at Campobello Island and razed several buildings. In June 1866, the Fenians conducted their largest raid, the Battle of Ridgeway on 2 June. During the battle, 750–800 Fenians managed to repel a force of nearly 900 Canadian militiamen, largely owing to the inexperience of the latter force. However, as the Fenians expected more British and Canadian soldiers to arrive, they retreated from the area shortly afterwards. In the same month, another Fenian raiding party of 200 Fenians was quickly defeated near Pigeon Hill.

The threat of another raid in 1870 led the government to mobilize 13,000 volunteers. A raiding party of 600 Fenians was defeated in May 1870 during the Battle of Eccles Hill. Another raiding party was launched two days after Eccles Hill, although it was defeated at the Battle of Trout River. The last raid took place in October 1871, when 40 Fenians occupied a customs house near the Manitoba-Minnesota border, hoping to elicit the support of Louis Riel and the Métis. However, Riel raised volunteers to defend the settlement against the Fenians. The US Army later arrived and arrested the Fenians there. By the 1870s, the US was not prepared to risk war with the UK and intervened when the Fenians threatened to endanger American neutrality.

Although the militia was able to prevent the Fenians from accomplishing its goals, the raids also revealed shortfalls in its leadership, structure, and training. This prompted several reforms in the militia in the years after the raids.

British Army in Canada in the late–19th century
By the mid-1860s, the colonies of British North America faced increasing pressure to take up their own defences from the British, who were looking to alleviate themselves of the defence expenses for British North America, and so they can reposition its soldiers to more strategic regions. Pressure from London, as well as the ensuing American Civil War, prompted the various colonies to consider uniting into a single federation. Although some questioned the need to unite after the American Civil War ended in 1865, subsequent raids by the Fenian Brotherhood made most people in British North America in favour of Canadian Confederation, which eventually occurred in 1867. 

Americans held several grievances as a result of British transgressions during the American Civil War,  like allowing several Confederate officials, including Jefferson Davis, entry into British North America at the end of the war. These grievances were presented to the British in 1869, in which the US demanded payment for damages for said transgressions. A British delegation including Canadian prime minister, John A. Macdonald was sent to Washington to negotiate a settlement, resulting in the Treaty of Washington in 1871. With most of the British North American colonies joining Canadian confederation, and American grievances having been settled by 1871, the majority of the British garrison in Canada was withdrawn that year, save for Halifax and Esquimalt, where British garrisons remained in place purely for reasons of imperial strategy.

Canadian enlistment in British forces after 1871
Enlistment into the British military by Canadians continued after Canadian Confederation and the withdrawal of the British Army from the country in 1871. Several Canadians who wanted to pursue overseas military service chose to enlist with the British military instead of joining the Canadian Active Militia, whose command had little interest in expeditionary combat. The British Army also specifically targeted Canadians for recruitment to replenish certain units, like the 100th Regiment of Foot. Canadians continued to join the British Army's enlisted ranks into the First World War, with several thousand Canadians having served with British units during that war.

The British War Office also maintained officer's commissions specifically for Canadian "gentlemen and journeymen" to fill vacancies and replenish the British officer corps. The recruitment of Canadians into the British officer corps was encouraged by the War Office as a way to promote military interoperability between Canada and the UK, and to make the Canadian government more amicable towards the idea of permitting its military to participate in British expeditionary campaigns overseas. By 1892, approximately two out of three graduates of the Royal Military College of Canada (RMC) who received a commission choose to join the British military as opposed to the Canadian Permanent Force.

By the end of the 19th century, RMC graduates in the British military had taken part in 27 campaigns in Africa, Burma, India, and China. From 1880 to 1918, approximately a quarter of all RMC graduates took up a commission with the British military. Recruitment of RMC officer cadets into the British military declined in the early 20th century due to efforts by Frederick William Borden, the Canadian minister of militia and defence from 1896 to 1911. In the following three years after Borden's tenure as minister, over half of all graduates who opted to pursue a military career chose to join the Permanent Force instead of the British military.

Canadian militia in the late–19th century

The Militia Act of 1855 was passed by the Province of Canada, reorganizing the Canadian militia into two classes, the "sedentary" and "Active" militias. The Militia Act of 1868 was later passed by the new Canadian federation, largely based on the 1855 Act. Following the departure of the British Army in 1871, the Canadian militia shouldered the main responsibility for Canada's defence. However, the Royal Navy continued to provide for Canada's maritime defence, and it was understood that the British would send aid in the event of an emergency.

The sedentary militia, later renamed the "Reserve Militia", was the traditional militia force made up of male inhabitants aged 18 to 60, and was typically only mobilized only in the event of an emergency. Male inhabitants in Canada were not obliged to drill or serve in peacetime outside of an annual muster. The Active Militia was formed in the 1855 Act and was initially made up of three components, the "Volunteer Militia", the "Regular Militia", and the "Marine Militia". The Volunteer Militia was made up of artillery, cavalry and infantry units that were drilled, and were compensated on a part-time basis. The Regular Reserve was made up of former serving men, who in the event of an emergency, can be balloted for service. The Marine Militia were companies of sailors that navigated Canadian waters. 

The Active Militia became more professionalized in the 1870s and 1880s. In 1871, two professional artillery batteries were created within the Active Militia. The Active Militia further expanded through the Militia Act of 1883, with the authorization of a new troop of cavalry, another artillery battery, and three infantry companies. These were intended to provide the professional backbone of the Permanent Force, a "continuous service" component of the Active Militia. Although the Active Militia was expanded, its marine component had largely vanished, with the last marine militia unit being disbanded in 1878.

In 1884, the British requested Canada for aid, as they required experienced boatmen to help relieve British forces under Major-General Charles Gordon at the siege of Khartoum. However, the government was reluctant to comply, resulting in Governor General Lord Lansdowne to send only a private force of 386 Voyageurs under the command of Canadian militia officers. This force, known as the Nile Voyageurs, served in Sudan and became the first Canadian force to serve outside North America. Sixteen Voyageurs died during the campaign.

Late–19th century conflicts in western Canada
In October 1870, one of the last major battles between the Blackfoot Confederacy and the Cree took place near present-day Lethbridge, when a Cree war party engaged a Piikani Nation camp at the Battle of the Belly River. The Cree war party was defeated, as they did not realize the members of the Kainai Nation and Piegan Blackfeet were also at the camp. The Blackfoot's use of revolving rifles may have also contributed to their victory. However their victory was pyrrhic, as their losses made them vulnerable to attack. Both sides lost as many as 300 warriors during the battle.

Riel Rebellions

In the late 19th century, Louis Riel led two separate resistances against the Canadian government. These resistances occurred during a period when the Canadian government was pursuing the settlement of western Canada, and the signing of land transfer treaties between several First Nations and the Crown.

The first resistance led by Riel, the Red River Rebellion (1869–1870), occurred in the months leading up to the 1870 transfer of Rupert's Land from the Hudson's Bay Company to Canada. In December 1869, Riel and other Métis settlers of the Red River Colony seized Upper Fort Garry, and planned to hold it until they could negotiate favourable terms for the colony's entry into Canadian confederation. After an English-speaking settler was executed, a military expedition made up of 400 British regulars and 800 Canadian militiamen was organized to retake the fort. Fearing arrest, Riel and his co-conspirators fled to the US before the expedition arrived in August 1870. Despite its leaders having to flee to the US, the resistance was successful in achieving its major objectives, with the federal government recognizing the "rights" of the Red River settlers through the establishment of the province of Manitoba.

In 1884, Riel returned from the US and began to rally local Métis in the North-West Territories to press their grievances against the Canadian government. In March 1885, an armed force of Métis formed the Provisional Government of Saskatchewan, with Riel named its president. A five-month insurgency, known as the North-West Rebellion, began later that month after a Métis force defeated a contingent of North-West Mounted Police (NWMP) members at the Battle of Duck Lake. The Métis victory at Duck Lake emboldened the Plains Cree under Big Bear, who attacked Battleford, Frog Lake, and Fort Pitt.

In response, the Canadian government mobilized 3,000 militiamen for service in the region, the largest Canadian military effort since the War of 1812. Although General Frederick Middleton originally planned for the 3,000-person force to move together by rail, the attacks at Battleford and Frog Lake prompted him to send a 900-person force ahead of the main contingent. However, after this forward force was repelled at the Battle of Fish Creek, Middleton decided to wait for the rest of the contingent, before launching a successful siege against Riel's outnumbered followers at the Battle of Batoche. Although Riel was captured at Batoche in May, resistance from Big Bear's followers continued until 3 June at the Battle of Loon Lake. Canadian militia and NWMP casualties during the North-West Rebellion include 58 killed and 93 wounded.

20th century

Boer War 

The issue of Canada providing direct military assistance for British imperial campaigns arose again during the Second Boer War (1899–1902). After the British requested assistance from Canada for its war in South Africa, the Conservative Party became adamantly in favour of raising 8,000 troops for service. English Canadian opinion was also overwhelmingly in favour of active Canadian participation in the war. However, French Canadians almost universally opposed the war, as did several other groups. This split the governing Liberal Party, as it relied on both pro-imperial Anglo-Canadians and anti-imperial Franco-Canadians for support. Prime Minister Wilfrid Laurier was a man of compromise and was worried about tensions between Anglo- and Franco-Canadians on the home front. Intimidated by his imperial cabinet, Laurier initially committed a token force of 1,000 soldiers of the 2nd Battalion, Royal Canadian Regiment of Infantry.

Two additional contingents were later dispatched to South Africa. The second contingent was made up of 6,000 volunteers from three artillery batteries and two mounted regiments, Royal Canadian Dragoons and the 1st Regiment, Canadian Mounted Rifles. The third was made up of the Strathcona's Horse, a unit entirely funded by The Lord Strathcona and Mount Royal. By the end of 1902, the Canadian Mounted Rifles had raised six regiments for service in South Africa. In addition to Canadian military units, several Canadians also served with the British Army's South African Constabulary. 

The Canadian forces missed the early period of the war and the great British defeats of Black Week. Canadian units in South Africa won much acclaim after they led the final night attack at the Battle of Paardeberg that resulted in the Boers' surrender, and one of the first decisive victories of the war for the Empire. At the Battle of Leliefontein in November 1900, three members Royal Canadian Dragoons, Lieutenant Turner, Lieutenant Cockburn, Sergeant Holland and Arthur Richardson were awarded the Victoria Cross for protecting the rear of a retreating force. The Dragoons are the only Canadian unit to have three Victoria Crosses awarded to its members in a single action. One of the last major engagements of the war involving Canadian units was the Battle of Hart's River in March 1902, which occurred after an imperial column of 1,800 soldiers ran into a larger Boer force of 2,500 men while on patrol. During the conflict, Canadian forces also participated in maintaining British-run concentration camps that resulted in the deaths of thousands of Boer civilians.

Approximately 8,600 Canadians volunteered for service during the Boer War. About 7,400 Canadians, including 12 nursing sisters, served in South Africa. Of these, 224 died, 252 were wounded, and five were awarded the Victoria Cross. A wave of celebrations swept the country after the war, with many towns erecting their first public war memorials in commemoration of the war. However, the public debate over Canada's role in the war also damaged relations between English and French Canadians.

Early 20th century military developments 

During the Second Boer War, a debate developed over reforming the Canadian Militia into a full-fledged professional army. The last British Army General Officer Commanding the Canadian Militia, Lord Dundonald, instituted a series of reforms in which Canada gained its own technical and support branches. In 1904, the position was replaced with a Canadian Chief of the General Staff. The new various "corps" included the Engineer Corps (1903), Signalling Corps (1903), Service Corps (1903), Ordnance Stores Corps (1903), Corps of Guides (1903), Medical Corps (1904), Staff Clerks (1905), and Army Pay Corps (1906). Additional corps would be created in the years before and during the First World War, including the first separate military dental corps.

Creation of a Canadian navy 

Canada had a small fishing protection force attached to the Department of Marine and Fisheries but relied on the UK for maritime protection. As the British became further embroiled in a naval arms race with Germany, in 1908, it asked the colonies for assist Imperial naval strategy. The Conservative Party argued that Canada should merely contribute money to the purchase and upkeep of some Royal Navy vessels. Some French Canadian nationalists felt that no aid should be sent, while others advocated establishing an independent Canadian navy that could provide aid the British in times of need.

Eventually, Prime Minister Laurier decided to follow this compromise position, and the Canadian Naval Service was created in 1910 and designated as the Royal Canadian Navy (RCN) in August 1911. To appease imperialists, the Naval Service Act included a provision that in case of emergency, the fleet could be turned over to the British. This provision led to the strenuous opposition to the bill by Quebec nationalist Henri Bourassa. The bill set a goal of building a navy composed of five cruisers and six destroyers. With the election of the Conservatives in 1911, in part because the Liberals had lost support in Quebec, the navy was starved for funds, but it was greatly expanded during the First World War.

First World War 

 
On August 5, 1914, the British Empire, including Canada, entered the First World War (1914–1918) as a part of the Entente powers. As a dominion of the Empire, the Canadian government had control over what the country would provide for the war effort. Military spending rose considerably in Canada during the war. To alleviate the financial burden, income taxes were introduced, and Victory Loan campaigns was organized to raise funds. Canada also sold munitions to the British due to the Shell Crisis of 1915, with the Imperial Munitions Board being established to coordinate the industry.

The Canadian Militia was not mobilized and instead an independent Canadian Expeditionary Force (CEF) was raised for overseas service. The CEF included infantry batallions and the Canadian Cavalry Brigade. However, the militia was tasked with handling the recruitment and the enlistment process for the CEF. Canada also formed the Canadian Forestry Corps, a division that harvested wood in France and Scotland for the war effort.

The first Canadian contingent of soldiers was dispatched to Europe on October 3, 1914. The first major engagement Canadians took part in was the Second Battle of Ypres from April–May 1915. At Ypres, Canadian soldiers managed to resist the first mass poison gas attack in modern history, holding a tactically-important section of the front line during the gas attack until they were reinforced. In the months after Ypres, the Canadian Corps was formed from the CEF in September 1915 after the arrival of the 2nd Canadian Division in France. The corps was expanded by the addition of the 3rd Canadian Division in December 1915 and the 4th Canadian Division in August 1916. A 5th Canadian Division was organized in February 1917, although it never fully formed, and was broken up in February 1918, with its men used to reinforce the other four divisions.

In the first half of 1916, Canadian divisions took part in several local actions, including the Actions of St Eloi Craters, and the Battle of Mont Sorrel. The British Somme Offensive began on July 1, where on its first day, the Royal Newfoundland Regiment was annihilated at the Battle of Albert. Canadian divisions were deployed in the Somme in August 1916. After the Somme Offensive, there was considerable pressure among Canadian leaders for the corps to fight as a unit rather than being spread out with various British units. The four divisions of the Canadian Corps were finally grouped together to take Vimy Ridge. After weeks of preparation and bombardment, the Canadians took the ridge in five days in the Battle of Vimy Ridge, an early stage engagement of the Battle of Arras.
  

Shortly after Vimy Ridge, Canadian Lieutenant-General Arthur Currie was assigned as the new corps commander. Currie went on to lead the corps during the Battle of Hill 70 and the Battle of Passchendaele in 1917. In 1918, the corps was dispatched to Amiens to reinforce the lines and participate in the Hundred Days Offensive. In the later stages of the war, the corps were among the most effective and respected of the military formations on the Western Front. During this three-month period, the Canadian Corps fought in a series of engagements, including the Battle of Amiens and the Battle of Cambrai. The corps' significant drive east from Amiens on 8 August to Mons by the Armistice of 11 November 1918, has been called Canada's Hundred Days.

Throughout the war, the Royal Canadian Navy participated in the Atlantic U-boat campaign, primarily providing coastal submarine patrols. Canada also suffered from several maritime disasters. The Halifax Explosion occurred on December 6, 1917, when a ship collision involving a munition ship loaded with explosives caused one of the largest human-made explosions before the detonation of the first atomic bomb in 1945. The resulting disaster saw 11,000 casualties, including 2,000 dead, and resulted in the entire north end of the city being wiped out. In June 1918,  was sunk by a U-boat. In terms of the number of dead, the sinking was the most significant Canadian naval disaster of the war.

For a nation of eight million people, Canada's war effort was significant. A total of 619,636 people served in the Canadian forces during the war. Of those, 59,544 were killed and 154,361 were wounded In addition to Canadian military forces, Canadians also served in British military forces, like the Royal Navy and the Royal Flying Corps. By the end of the war, nearly a quarter of all the pilots in the Royal Flying Corps were Canadian, including flying aces Billy Bishop, Raymond Collishaw and William George Barker. Canada's contribution to the war provided the dominion with a greater degree of autonomy from the British Empire, and a modest diplomatic presence in the Paris Peace Conference. The increased autonomy, as well as the divisions created by the Conscription Crisis of 1917, made Canada hesitant to participate in further military expeditions. This contributed to the Canadian decision to decline the British request for military aid during the Chanak Crisis in 1922.

Conscription
Although there was an initial wave of enthusiastic volunteers in 1914, by 1916, enthusiasm to enlist waned. At the 1917 Imperial War Cabinet, the British implored its dominions to provide more troops to alleviate shortages stemming from the dissolution of the Russian Empire and the French Army mutinies. Borden, who wished to maintain the continuity of Canada's military contribution, campaigned for conscription in the 1917 Canadian federal election, which became a divisive national topic of debate.

The election was won by Borden's Unionist Party, a coalition made up of pro-conscription Conservatives and Liberals, who subsequently passed the Military Service Act, 1917. However, a number of exemptions from service had to be added to get the act passed by the Canadian parliament. As a result, after conscription went into effect in 1918, of the over 400,000 people who were called upon for conscription, 380,510 people appealed it. By the end of the war, only 24,132 conscripts were sent to Europe to join the CEF. The adoption of conscription saw mixed reactions, with English Canadians being in favour of conscription, while French Canadians; and some English-speaking ­farmers, trade union leaders, pacifists, and Indigenous leaders were opposed to it. The resulting Conscription Crisis of 1917 did much to highlight the divisions between English and French Canada.

Commemoration

Eight memorials in France and Belgium were erected to commemorate Canada's war dead. Six memorials follow a standard design of granite monuments surrounded by a circular path, including the Hill 62 Memorial and Passchendaele Memorial in Belgium, and the Bourlon Wood Memorial, Courcelette Memorial, Dury Memorial, and Le Quesnel Memorial in France. The Canadian National Vimy Memorial and Saint Julien Memorial are two other memorials that are unique in design. 

The war's impact on Canadian society also led to the construction of several war memorials in Canada. Proposals to create a national memorial were first madein 1923, although work on would didn't occur until the 1930s. The casts was complete in 1933, although the Canadian National War Memorial was unveiled in Ottawa in 1939. The monument has since been used to commemorate Canadian war dead for other conflicts.

There are also separate war memorials to commemorate the actions of the soldiers of Newfoundland (at the time a separate British dominion) in the war. The largest are the Beaumont-Hamel Newfoundland Memorial and the Newfoundland National War Memorial in St. John's.

Interwar period
Following the end of the First World War, the Canadian Expeditionary Force was disbanded, and its lineage was perpetuated through Canadian militia after the latter's reorganization. In 1921, the Active Militia was also reorganized, wih Permanent Force becoming the Permanent Active Militia, and the Active Militia's military reserve component becoming the Non-Permanent Active Militia. An officers' roll for the sedentary Reserve Militia was also maintained, although the Reserve Militia itself was unorganized. In 1922, the National Defence Act was passed, bringing together the Department of Militia and Defence, and the air and naval service portfolio under a single Department of National Defence.

Russian Civil War

Acceding to the British request for aid, the Canadian government dispatched nearly 6,000 soldiers to assist the Allied intervention in the Russian Civil War in mid-1918. Approximately 4,200 soldiers were assigned to the Canadian Siberian Expeditionary Force (CSEF), a contingent based in the Russian Far East city of Vladivostok. Another Canadian contingent was dispatched as a part of the larger Allied North Russian Expeditionary Force in northwest Russia, near the ports of Arkhangelsk and Murmansk.

The British War Office initially requested Canadian assistance in May 1918, specifically for commissioned and non-commissioned officers to provide administrative and instructional duties in northwest Russia. A small volunteer party selected from units stationed in London was dispatched to Murmansk as a part of a larger Allied contingent in June 1918. Further requests for Canada to provide an artillery brigade unit in northern Russia were made and approved in August 1918, with the 16th Canadian Field Artillery having disembarked at Arkhangelsk in October 1918. In the same month, the first CSEF soldiers had also landed in Vladivostok. 

The continued commitment of Canadian soldiers after the Armistice of 11 November 1918 became a topic of debate with members of the Privy Council of Canada. Although the Privy Council was divided on the issue, it was agreed that Canada's commitment to the Allied intervention would at least continue until the spring of 1919. However, the Privy Council also insisted that the use of Canadian units in Allied military operations could only occur with the express consent of the Canadian government.

Some Canadians saw combat in northwest Russia and as pilots over the Black Sea. However, Canadian troops attached to CSEF in Vladivostok — the majority of Canadian soldiers in Russia — saw little combat before they withdrew. CSEF soldiers began their withdrawal from Russia in April 1919. The 16th Canadian Field Artillery Brigade withdrew from northwest Russia in June 1919. 21 Canadians died during the Allied intervention in Russia, the majority from disease or accidents.

Formation of the Canadian Air Force

The First World War was the catalyst for the formation of Canada's air force. At the outbreak of war, there was no independent Canadian air force, although many Canadians flew with the British Royal Flying Corps and the Royal Naval Air Service. In 1914 the Canadian government authorized the formation of the Canadian Aviation Corps. The corps was to accompany the Canadian Expeditionary Force to Europe and consisted of one aircraft, a Burgess-Dunne. The Canadian Aviation Corps was disbanded in 1915. A second attempt at forming a Canadian air force was made in 1918 when a Canadian bomber and fight squadron was created by the British Air Ministry in Europe. The Canadian government took control of the two squadrons by forming the Canadian Air Force. This air force, however, never saw service and was completely disbanded by 1921.

During the 1920s the British government encouraged Canada to institute a peacetime air force by providing several surplus aircraft. In 1920 a new Canadian Air Force (CAF) directed by the Air Board was formed as a part-time or militia service providing flying refresher training. After a reorganization the CAF became responsible for all flying operations in Canada, including civil aviation. Air Board and CAF civil flying responsibilities were handled by the Royal Canadian Air Force (RCAF) after its creation in April 1924. The Second World War would see the RCAF become a truly military service.

Spanish Civil War

The Canadian government did not officially become involved in the Spanish Civil War (1936–1939), however, over 1,500 Canadians fought for the Spanish Republican faction. Most volunteers were recent immigrants, members of the Communist Party of Canada, or were forced into a relief camp. Canadian volunteers initially joined the British Battalion, the Abraham Lincoln Battalion or the George Washington Battalion; with approximately 40 Canadians having served in the latter two battalions. In July 1937, a unit for Canadian volunteers in the Republican faction was mustered into the XV International Brigade. The Canadian unit, the Mackenzie-Papineau Battalion, fought in five major campaigns, including the assault on Fuentes de Ebro in 1937, the Battle of Teruel, the Aragon Offensive, and the Battle of the Ebro. It is estimated between 400 to 721 Canadian volunteers died as a result of the conflict.

Second World War

The Second World War (1939–1945) began on September 1, 1939, with Nazi Germany's invasion of Poland. The Canadian declaration of war on Germany was issued on September 10, several days after the British and French. Although Canada was a major contributor to the war, it took no major part in its higher planning, with Prime Minister William Lyon Mackenzie King making no attempts to partake in it. The government initially envisaged Canada's contribution to be limited in size. However, the idea of a limited effort was abandoned after the German invasion of Belgium and France, with Canada increasing its military spending, the size of its armed forces, as well as introduce conscription for home defence by June 1940. Like the First World War, conscription for overseas service was a divisive issue, with some English Canadians supporting it and French Canadians opposing it. The issue came to head during the Conscription Crisis of 1944 when Mackenzie King was pressured to accept conscription for overseas service from his conscriptionist cabinet members.

Hostilities came to end in September 1945. Canada participated in the Paris Peace Treaties of 1947, and signed peace treaties with Finland, Italy, Hungary, and Romania. In 1951, Canada issued a royal proclamation to end the state of war with Germany, and signed the Treaty of San Francisco to end it with Japan. Of a population of approximately 11.5 million, 1.1 million Canadians served with the Canadian military during the war. More than 45,000 died, and another 55,000 were wounded.

Canadian Army operations

The Canadian Militia (reorganized into the Canadian Army in 1940) saw limited action in the initial phase of the war, with the 1st Canadian Division only briefly deploying with the Second British Expeditionary Force during the fall of France. By 1940, several Canadian units were deployed to the UK to defend it against German assault. After the British abandoned most of their equipment at the Battle of Dunkirk, the 1st Canadian Division was one of the only military formations left in the UK that was completely intact in terms of equipment and manpower. In December 1941, two Canadian battalions known as C Force took part in the Battle of Hong Kong, while the 2nd Canadian Division led the Dieppe Raid in August 1942. In the same year, the First Canadian Army was formed and spent most of its time training for an invasion of northwest Europe in the UK

In July 1943, the 1st Canadian Division and the 5th Canadian Division and were heavily engaged in the Allied invasion of Sicily, as a part of the British Eighth Army. The Canadians also partook in the Allied invasion of Italy, and saw particularly severe fighting during the Battle of Ortona and the Moro River Campaign. In the spring of 1944, Canadian forces under Lieutenant-General E. L. M. Burns played a leading role in breaking through the Hitler Line. By 1944, the corps broke through the Gothic Line after battles like the Battle of Rimini. There were 92,757 Canadian soldiers that served in the Italian campaign, of whom 5,764 died.

The Canadian Army also took part in Operation Overlord, which began on June 6, 1944. During the Normandy landings, the 3rd Canadian Division and the 2nd Canadian Armoured Brigade secured Juno Beach. Canadian airborne troops also landed earlier in the day behind the beaches. The 2nd Canadian Infantry Division joined the campaign in July and the 4th Canadian Armoured Division in August. The Canadians played a leading role in the breakout from the Normandy bridgehead with the capture of Falaise pocket. After the breakout, the First Canadian Army cleared coastal fortress in campaigns like Operation Astonia. From October to November, the Canadians fought a series of battles to secure the Scheldt River and open Antwerp to Allied shipping.

In early 1945, Canadian units fought in the Siegfried Line campaign to clear a path to the Rhine River, preparing it for further Allied offensives on the far side of the Rhine. After the campaign, the First Canadian Army took part in the liberation of the Netherlands and the Western Allied invasion of Germany. When the German Instrument of Surrender was signed on May 5, the II Canadian Corps had taken Oldenburg. Approximately 237,000 Canadian soldiers served in North West Europe campaign in 1944 and 1945, among whom 11,336 died.

Air and sea operations

During the war, the Royal Canadian Navy grew significantly in size, with 471 combat ships, 99,688 men and some 6,500 women enlisted in the service by the war's end. The navy was primarily tasked with protecting supply and troop convoys from U-boat wolfpacks in the Battle of the Atlantic, with RCN warships credited with sinking 33 enemy submarines during the war. Following the Atlantic Convoy Conference in March 1943, the Canadian Northwest Atlantic Command was set up to coordinate Allied convoys north of New York City, and was placed under the command of Canadian Rear-Admiral Leonard W. Murray. In addition to the Atlantic campaigns, RCN warships also took part in Allied landing in North Africa in November 1942, and the Normandy landings in June 1944. In addition to the RCN, many Canadians also served with the Canadian Merchant Navy.

The Royal Canadian Air Force also contributed to the war effort. However, early overseas commitments by the RCAF were hampered by the management of the British Commonwealth Air Training Plan (BCATP), a British Empire-wide pilot training program. Although Canada had agreed to host the majority of BCATP's facilities and finance three-quarters of its costs, the British had expected BCATP graduates to move on to the British Royal Air Force (RAF). However, Mackenzie King's intervention saw some Canadian BCATP graduates move on as members of the RCAF. Because of this early dynamic though, a large number of Canadian BCATP graduates served in RAF units, like the No. 242 (Canadian) Squadron RAF, as opposed to an RCAF unit. At its peak, there were 107 schools and 184 ancillary BCATP units across Canada. By the end of 1945, 131,553 pilots graduated from BCATP in Canada, and flew with either the RAF, RCAF or with another British Commonwealth and Allied air force.

Although the BCATP delayed the development of overseas RCAF units, by the end of the war there were 48 RCAF squadrons stationed abroad. This includes No. 6 Group RCAF under RAF Bomber Command, a heavy bomber squadron that partook in the Combined Bomber Offensive. By wars end, Canadian airmen were present in every theatre of war, from North Africa, Italy, northwest Europe, the Pacific, and also played a small but significant role in the Battle of Britain, In addition to overseas squadrons, the RCAF units based in Canada coordinated with the Americans to attack the Japanese during the Aleutian Islands campaign and conducted anti-submarine operations in the Battle of the Atlantic. RCAF aircraft are credited with destroying or taking part in the destruction of 20 submarines. During the war, 232,632 men and 17,030 women served in the RCAF, of which, 17,101 died the war. By the end of the war, the RCAF was the fourth-largest allied air force.

Industry and research

In contrast to the First World War, Canadian industries in the Second World War produced a variety of war materials, including small arms, warships, aircraft and other vehicles; of which, a total of 815,729 were built. Over half of all war material produced in Canada was sent to the UK, with the Canadian government arranging for the Billion Dollar Gift package to help the UK finance those acquisitions. Canadian financial assistance to the UK during the war amounted to $3.043 billion. The demand for labour saw many women enter the labour force for the first time, taking jobs vacated by enlisted men. The Canadian Women's Army Corps and the RCAF Women's Division were also formed relieve male military members for front-line duties.

During the war, Canada aided British and American efforts in the development of the atomic bomb. In 1942, Canada and the UK formed a nuclear research partnership, as the British needed to relocate its Tube Alloys nuclear research program to a safer location with an abundance of resources; resulting in the Montreal Laboratory. In the same year, the Canadian government purchased the Eldorado Mine to mine uranium. The British and Americans agreed to cooperate on nuclear weapons development during the First Quebec Conference in 1943, and the Montreal Laboratory was absorbed into the Manhattan Project.

Cold War years 

Soon after the end of the Second World War, the Cold War (1946–1991) began. The formal onset of the Cold War, is usually credited to the 1945 defection of a Soviet cipher clerk working in Ottawa, Igor Gouzenko. This was the first event that led to "PROFUNC", a Government of Canada top secret plan to identify and detain communist sympathizers during the height of the Cold War. As a founding member of NATO and a signatory to the NORAD treaty with the US, Canada committed itself to the alliance against the Communist bloc. Canadian troops were stationed in Germany throughout the Cold War, and Canada joined with the Americans to erect defences against Soviet attack, such as the DEW Line. As a middle power, Canadian policy makers realized that Canada could do little militarily on its own, and thus a policy of multilateralism was adopted whereby Canada's international military efforts would be a part of a larger coalition. This led to Canada choosing to stay out of several wars despite the participation of close allies, most notably the Vietnam War and the Second Iraq War, although Canada lent indirect support and Canadian citizens served in foreign armies in both conflicts.

Korean War 

When the Korean War (1950–1953) broke out, Canada was an early supporter of forming the United Nations military force to liberate South Korea. Canadian military personnel that served in Korea was part of the larger British Commonwealth Forces Korea. Canada's initially contributed three Royal Canadian Navy destroyers and a Royal Canadian Air Force military transport squadron, the No. 426 Squadron RCAF, to assit with the war effort. Eight RCN vessels would eventually take turns serving in Korean waters, either protecting the UN fleet or conducting onshore operations. Twenty-two RCAF fighter pilots also flew jet aircraft on exchange duty with the United States Air Force in Korea. 

The Canadian Army had to spend several months mobilizing its forces back to wartime strength after it went through a period of rapid demilitarization after World War II. Mounting domestic pressure for a larger commitment led to the Canadian Army to form Special Force (later renamed the 25th Canadian Infantry Brigade) for service in Korea. The first Canadian Army units arrived in Korea in December 1950, having arrived after the early campaigns of the war and when the attrition phase of the conflict was beginning. For army units, the war was described as a "war of patrols" in rough, mountainous terrain. However, the Canadian Army also participated in several heavier engagements including the Battle of Kapyong and the Battle of Kowang-san.

Canada sent 26,791 troops to fight in Korea. There were 1,558 Canadian casualties, including 516 dead. The conflict is often described as the "Forgotten War", because it was overshadowed by the preceding world wars. Canada is a signatory to the 1953 Korean Armistice Agreement. Canadian maintained a garrison in Korea until 1955, whose soldiers primarily patrolled the South Korea side of the Korean Demilitarized Zone after the armistice. The last Canadian soldiers serving under the UN force left Korea in 1957.

Forces in Europe 

The Cold War was the first time the Canadian military stationed units abroad during peacetime. The Canadian Army and Royal Canadian Air Force maintained a contingent in Western Europe from the early 1950s to 1993. Approximately 100,000 members of the Canadian military served in France and West Germany during the Cold War. The army's and air force's contingent was known as Canadian Forces Europe.

As a part of Canada's commitment to NATO, the 27th Canadian Infantry Brigade (later named 4 Combat Group and 4 Canadian Mechanized Brigade) was formed for service in West Germany. The brigade was initially a self-contained force made up of 6,700 soldiers assigned to three infantry battalions, an armoured regiment, a reconnaissance squadron, an antitank company, an artillery regiment, and a surface-to-surface battery equipped with MGR-1 Honest John nuclear missiles. However, after a defence review in 1970, the brigade had lost its nuclear capabilities, and its size was scaled back. In 1977, the brigade was reassigned from its frontline role as a part of the British commitment in northern Germany to the rear area reserve force supporting American and German forces in southern Germany. In addition to the mechanized infantry brigade, the Canadian Army also provided two infantry battalion groups to Allied Command Europe Mobile Force in 1964, to help secure the alliance's northern and southern flanks. However, by the late 1960s, only one battalion was provided to the quick reaction force.

Canada also formed the 1 Air Division in 1951, to meet Canada's air defence commitments for NATO. The air division was initially headquartered in Metz, and was made up of two wings in France, and another two in Germany. Originally a day/all-weather interceptor division, its role was changed to nuclear strike and reconnaissance in 1962, and again in 1966 to only reconnaissance. RCAF assets in France were also relocated to Germany in 1966 due to the French withdrawal from NATO.

The army and air force also formed the Canadian Air-Sea Transportable Brigade Group (CAST), a 5,000-person "at-home" brigade that was formed in 1968 to support Canadian commitments in Europe. Although it was stationed in Canada, the brigade was supposed to have the capability to deploy to Norway with 30 days' notice. CAST only deployed once to Norway for a military exercise in 1986, before it was disbanded in 1989.

Unification of Canada's military 

The unification of Canada's military forces was explored as early as the 1930s. Several elements of the armed forces were unified by the late 1940s and 1950s, including its military colleges, and some administrative elements. The complete unification of the armed forces was pursued in the 1960s under Minister of National Defence Paul Hellyer, believing it would prevent inefficient duplication of services and would cut costs. In August 1964, an amendment to the National Defence Act restructured the three services under a new unified command structure, with the three service chiefs replaced by a singular Chief of the Defence Staff. After the passage of the Canadian Forces Reorganization Act 1968, the three services ceased to exist as separate entities and became branches of a singular Canadian Armed Forces (CAF).

Hellyer's attempts to unify Canada's military were only partially successful. Although support services and headquarter commands were fully unified, and the consolidation of some services to cut costs was praised; other changes, like the unification of ranking structure and service uniforms, made the process unpopular with certain members of the public and service members in the CAF. As a result of continued opposition to unification from the army, air force, and navy, by 2014, many of the changes introduced by Hellyer were reversed.

October Crisis

The October Crisis was a series of events triggered by two kidnappings of government officials by members of the Front de libération du Québec (FLQ) during October 1970 in the province of Quebec, mainly in the Montreal metropolitan area. During the domestic terrorist crisis Prime Minister Pierre Trudeau, when asked how far he was willing to go to resolve the problem, responded "Just watch me", a phrase that has become famous in Canadian culture. Three days later, on October 16, the circumstances ultimately culminated in the only peacetime use of the War Measures Act in Canada's history. The invocation of the act resulted in widespread deployment of 12,500 Canadian Forces troops throughout Quebec, with 7,500 troops stationed within the Montreal area.

Vietnam War 

Officially, Canada was a "non-belligerent" throughout the Vietnam War (1955–1975), serving as an "impartial and objective peacekeeper" on two international truce commissions, the International Control Commission and the International Commission of Control and Supervision. Because of this, the Canadian military's involvement in Vietnam was limited to a small contingent in 1973 to help enforce the Paris Peace Accords.

However, Canadian diplomats also provided tacit support for US counterinsurgency and espionage efforts in Vietnam. Canadian diplomats later argued such partisan efforts were to counterbalance the activities of Eastern bloc countries who were also members of the truce commissions. During the war, Canadian firms sold approximately $12.5 billion of war material to the US, including aircraft engines, ammunition, clothing and food for their soldiers, explosives, napalm, and raw materials for shell casings, plate armour and military transports. Testing of Agent Orange, a tactical herbicide used in Vietnam, also took place in Canada.

There were a number of American Vietnam War resisters in Canada, with the country seeing an influx of draft dodgers and military deserters from the US during the conflict. Approximately 20,000 draft dodgers and 12,000 military deserters sought refuge in Canada from military service in Vietnam. In a counter-current to the movement of American draft dodgers and deserters to Canada, approximately 20,000 Canadians volunteered with the United States Armed Forces to fight in southeast Asia. It is estimated that between 110 to 134 Canadians died during the conflict. Seven remain listed as missing in action.

Post–Cold War era 
During the 1990s, the Canadian Armed Forces responded to several international crises as a part of a multinational force, as well as deployed within Canada to provide aid during natural disasters.

Domestically, the Forces deployed over 8,500 military personnel to Manitoba after the 1997 Red River flood to help with evacuation, building dikes, and other flood-fighting efforts; over 16,000 to provide relief in New Brunswick, Ontario and Quebec after the North American ice storm of 1998; and over 2,600 soldiers to provide forest fire relief in British Columbia as a part of Operation Peregrine in 2003. The Forces' deployment for the 1998 ice storm was the largest deployment of troops ever to serve on Canadian soil in response to a natural disaster, and the largest operational deployment of Canadian military personnel since the Korean War.

Oka Crisis 

The Oka Crisis was a land dispute between a group of Mohawk people and the town of Oka in southern Quebec, which began on July 11, 1990, and lasted until September 26. On August 8, Quebec premier Robert Bourassa announced that he had invoked Section 275 of the National Defence Act to requisition military support in "aid of the civil power", a right available to provincial governments that was invoked after one police officer and two Mohawk were killed during the conflict. The Chief of the Defence Staff, General John de Chastelain placed Quebec-based troops in support of the provincial authorities. During Operation Salon, 2,500 regular and reserve troops were mobilized. Troops and mechanized equipment mobilized at staging areas around Oka and Montreal, while reconnaissance aircraft staged air photo missions over Mohawk territory to gather intelligence. Despite high tensions between military and First Nations forces, no shots were exchanged. On September 1, freelance photographer Shaney Komulainen took a photograph of men staring each other down. Entitled Face to Face, it has become one of Canada's most famous images.

Gulf War 

Canada had condemned the Iraqi invasion of Kuwait and quickly agreed to join the US-led coalition. Over 5,100 Canadian military personnel served in the war. At its peak, 2,700 personnel were in the region at one time. Canadian Forces operations were coordinated under Operation Friction. The Gulf War was the first conflict where female members of the Canadian Armed Forces served in combat roles.

In August 1990, Prime Minister Brian Mulroney committed the Canadian Forces to deploy a Naval Task Group. The destroyers  and  joined the maritime interdiction force supported by the supply ship . The Canadian Task Group led the coalition maritime logistics forces in the Persian Gulf. Canadian warships conducted approximately a quarter of all coalition inspections of cargo ships and vessels suspected of running the coalition blockade. A fourth ship, arrived in-theatre after hostilities had ceased and were the first allied ship to visit Kuwait. 

Following the authorized use of force by the United Nations against Iraq, the Canadian Forces deployed a CF-18 Hornet and Sikorsky CH-124 Sea King squadron with support personnel. When the air war began, 24 Canadian CF-18s were integrated into the coalition force and were tasked with providing air cover and attacking ground targets. This was the first time since the Korean War that the Canadian military had participated in offensive combat operations. The only CF-18 Hornet to record an official victory during the conflict was an aircraft involved at the beginning of the Battle of Bubiyan against the Iraqi Navy.

The Canadian Army's participation during the Gulf War was largely limited to the deployment of 530-person military field hospital unit, and was attached to a British Army unit. A Canadian combat engineer regiment was investigated following the release of 1991 photographs which showed members posing with the dismembered bodies in a Kuwaiti minefield. From the end of the conflict to 2001, Canadian Forces provided soldiers for UNIKOM, a UN mission to monitor the demilitarized zone beteen Iraq and Kuwait.

Yugoslav Wars 

Since 1991, nearly 40,000 members of the Canadian Armed Forces and civilian police services, including the Royal Canadian Mounted Police, served in peacekeeping operations in the Balkans. These peacekeeping operations were led by either the UN, NATO or the EU. The Royal Canadian Navy also provided warships to assist with the NATO maritime blockade of the region, while the Royal Canadian Air Force provided six CF-18 Hornets to assist with the NATO bombing of Yugoslavia.

From 1991 to 1994, Canadian officers and support staff participated in the European Community Monitoring Mission in the Former Yugoslavia. In April 1992, the Canadian Forces provided an 860-person infantry battle group to the UNPROFOR, a UN-sanctioned force tasked with the demilitarization of select areas in Croatia. Another 800-person contingent was provided to UNPROFOR, after its mission was expanded and the conflict intensified and spread to Bosnia and Herzegovina. By 1993, two Canadian companies were tasked with holding a strategic salient along the frontlines of Serb and Croat forces, the Medak pocket, to maintain the truce and oversee the safe passage of refugees. The position was later reinforced by two French mechanized divisions.

In September 1993, Croat forces launched Operation Medak Pocket, and attacked Serb positions in the area. On 15 September, the Canadian-French position at Medak pocket was besieged by Croat forces, who returned fire with the force available to them. Medak Pocket was the largest battle fought by Canadian forces since the Korean War. The Canadian government reported that 27 Croatian soldiers were killed during the battle, and four Canadians wounded. The 2nd Battalion Princess Patricia's Canadian Light Infantry were later awarded the Commander-in-Chief Unit Commendation for their actions at Medak Pocket.

Other UN peacekeeping missions in the Balkans that the Canadian Forces provided for include UNCRO in Croatia, UNMIBH in Bosnia and Herzegovina, UNMIK in Kosovo, and UNPREDEP in North Macedonia. Other NATO missions in the region that the Canadian Forces provided for include IFOR and SFOR in Bosnia and Herzegovina, the Kosovo Force, and task forces Harvest and Fox in North Macedonia. EU missions involving the Canadian Forces include the EUFOR Concordia and Operation Althea.

Somali Civil War 

During the Somali Civil War, Prime Minister Brian Mulroney committed Canada to UNOSOM I after United Nations Security Council Resolution 751. UNOSOM I was the first part of the UN's response effort to provide security and humanitarian relief in Somalia, while monitoring UN-brokered ceasefires. The first group of soldiers from American-led, UN-sanctioned force, UNITAF, landed in Somalia in December 1992. The mission included soldiers from 23 countries, with Canada contributing approximately 1,400 soldiers primarily from the Canadian Airborne Regiment, and the oil replenisher  to assist with naval operations. In May 1993 the operation came under UN command and was renamed UNOSOM II.

Although the mission was intended to restore order and protect food and medical distribution sites in Somalia, the mission was only successful in achieving the latter. Because the UN presence was not welcomed by some warring factions of the civil war, the mission was unable to gain the cooperation of local warlords, enforce the mutually agreed upon ceasefire, or force an end to the conflict. 

Canadian forces were primarily based in Beledweyne and had primarily rebuilt roads and bridges, destroyed land mines, reopened hospitals and guarded food and aid convoys. However, by its end, the mission had turned into a political disaster for Canada. Canadian soldiers that were performing the aforementioned duties were frequently harassed by locals, with their encampment the target of looters. In response, the Canadian commander authorized soldiers to shoot looters in the leg if they ran. Another officer later permitted thieves to be "captured and abused." In March 1993, soldiers from the Canadian Airborne Regiment killed a Somali man that was attempting to escape after breaking into their encampment to steal supplies. A week later, members of the airborne regiment also tortured and killed a 16-year-old youth that broke into the encampment.

Alleged attempts to cover up the killings by senior officials at the Department of National Defence triggered a national scandal in Canada. A subsequent federal inquiry saw the careers of several military officers ended, several Canadian soldiers court-martialed, and the Canadian Airborne Regiment disbanded. The scandal saw the country's international reputation tarnished, in what was heralded as "the darkest era in the history of the Canadian military" since the end of World War II. The UN mission itself was also unsuccessful in restoring order to Somalia. Mounting casualties, particularly after the Battle of Mogadishu, led the US to withdraw its forces. The experience in Somalia had largely put an end to the use of a robust multinational military force to bring humanitarian aid to victims of civil war among western countries.

21st century 

During the early 21st century, Canada participated in several missions and campaigns in support of the global war on terror and the US-led Operation Enduring Freedom. From 2001 to 2012, Canada sent warships to Arabian Sea and the Gulf of Oman to help provide security for the region, search civilian vessels for suspected terrorists, and stem the illegal drug trade used to fund terrorism in the region. The deployment was the Canadian navy's largest since World War II, with 15 warships being dispatched to the region in support of the Canadian war effort in Afghanistan. At its peak in January 2002, six Canadian warships and 1,500 personnel were operating in the Arabian Sea and Gulf of Oman simultaneously.

War in Afghanistan 

Several weeks after the September 11th attacks against the US, Canada announced its intention to take part in the US-led war in Afghanistan (2001–2021). Several dozen soldiers from Canadian special forces units participated in the subsequent 2001 invasion of Afghanistan, with an infantry battle group of 1,200 soldiers later arriving in Kandahar in February 2002. Initially, soldiers in Kandahar were primarily tasked with fighting al-Qaeda and Taliban forces in the area, as well as protecting humanitarian operations. During this time, a Canadian sniper set the record for the longest recorded sniper kill.

After the invasion, Canadian units served as a part of NATO's International Security Assistance Force (ISAF). The Canadian Army provided a battle group of approximately 2,000 infantry soldiers, as well as armoured, artillery, and other support elements to ISAF. The Air Force also contributed tactical and transport elements to ISAF. From 2003 to 2005, the battle group was based in Kabul and was tasked with providing security and disarming Afghan militias. In November 2005, the Canadian military launched Operation Archer and shifted its focus from Kabul to Kandahar. The battle group was transferred to Kandahar in 2006 and was responsible for counter-insurgency operations and the region's Provincial Reconstruction Team. While in Kandahar, the battle group won a series of battles, like Operation Medusa and the Battle of Panjwaii. However, they were unable to root out the insurgent forces from the region, who were able to take refuge on the Pakistani side of the Afghanistan-Pakistan border. 

Public support for the war in Canada waned as casualties mounted in late 2006. This partly led to "the Canadian soldier" being selected by the Canadian Press' Canadian Newsmaker of the Year. Support for the war waned further after Joint Task Force 2 members were photographed handing over detainees to Afghan security forces, who were subsequently tortured. Despite growing public opposition, Canada remained committed to the war until 2011, partly due to the Canadian Forces' misrepresentation of the war's situation as a success. In 2011, Canada ended its combat mission in Afghanistan, and transferred responsibility for Kandahar back to the US However, some Canadian soldiers remained in Afghanistan until March 2014, to train the Afghan National Army and Afghan National Police as a part of the NATO Training Mission-Afghanistan. Members of Canadian Special Operations Forces Command were briefly redeployed to Afghanistan near the end of conflict in August 2021, to evacuate its citizens, close its embassy, and help facilitate the 2021 Kabul airlift.

Over 40,000 Canadian soldiers served during the 12-year mission in Afghanistan, the longest campaign Canadian military forces have participated in. There were 165 Canadians killed during the conflict, including 158 soldiers and seven civilians. The conflict also resulted in the first Canadian female killed in combat, Captain Nichola Goddard of the Royal Canadian Horse Artillery, on May 17, 2006. As of March 2020, approximately 17 per cent of Canadian soldiers that took part in the war suffered from post-traumatic stress disorder, with over 70 veterans of the war having committed suicide by December 2017.

Iraq War 

 
Canada did not join the US-led coalition of the willing, and was not a formal participant in the Iraq War (2003–2011). The country's relationship with the US was redefined at various points during the conflict. In the lead up to the conflict, there were many protests against the war in Canada. During the conflict, some Iraq War resisters in the US military sought refuge in Canada after deserting their posts to avoid deployment to Iraq.

Although the Canadian Armed Forces did not directly participate in the conflict, it did assist the coalition's war effort by taking up ship escort duties in the Persian Gulf, and expanding its participation in Task Force 151 to free up American naval assets. Approximately 100 Canadian Forces officers on exchange with US units that took part in the 2003 invasion of Iraq.

Libyan Civil War 

On 25 February 2011, the Canadian Forces launched Operation Mobile, an evacuation mission in response to the First Libyan Civil War. On 19 March, the operation's role was expanded to include air and maritime combat missions in support of the 2011 military intervention in Libya to implement United Nations Security Council Resolution 1973 NATO assumed military control for the multinational coalition on March 25 under Operation Unified Protector, with RCAF Lieutenant General Charles Bouchard named as its operational commander. The aim of the coalition was to establish a no-fly zone and prevent government forces loyal to Muammar Gaddafi from carrying out air attacks on anti-Gaddafi forces and civilians, carrying out a UN mandate to use all means, short of foreign occupation, to protect civilian-populated areas.

At its peak, 655 Canadians were deployed on Operation Mobile. Canada committed several aircraft to the intervention, including seven CF-18 fighter jets based in Italy. The frigate , who was already on station in the Mediterranean as part of Standing NATO Maritime Group 1, also joined the operation and patrolled the waters off Misrata to support the UN arms embargo. In May 2011, Charlottetown was attacked by a shore battery, becoming the first Canadian warship to come under hostile fire since the Korean War. On October 28, 2011, Prime Minister Stephen Harper announced that the military mission had ended successfully.

Mali War 

In 2012, several insurgent groups in Mali seized control of parts of the country. The Mali government requested military assistance from France in January 2013, who in turn asked its NATO allies to also lend assistance. The Canadian government initially provided one RCAF C-17 Globemaster III transport aircraft to assist the French military operation in Mali. This was followed by a deployment of 24 Joint Task Force 2 members to secure the Canadian embassy in the capital Bamako.

From 2018 to 2019, over 1,250 Canadian Armed Forces members deployed to Mali to support the UN peacekeeping mission, MINUSMA, with helicopter medical evacuations. In particular, the Canadian Forces sent 250 troops and eight helicopters to northern Mali. However, after 2019, the commitment was reduced to a small number of civilian and military personnel in the country.

War against the Islamic State

Operation Impact is the name of Canada's contribution to the war against the Islamic State that began in September 2014. The first Canadian airstrike against an Islamic State target occurred on 2 November. It was reported that CF-18s successfully destroyed heavy engineering equipment used to divert the Euphrates River near the city of Fallujah. In October, then Prime Minister designate Justin Trudeau informed President Barack Obama that Canada intended to withdraw its fighter aircraft while keeping its ground forces in Iraq and Syria.

Participation in peacekeeping missions 

Closely related to Canada's commitment to multi-lateralism has been its strong support for peacekeeping efforts. Canada's peacekeeping role during the 20th and 21st centuries has played a major part in its global image. Prior to Canada's role in the Suez Crisis, Canada was viewed by many as insignificant in global issues. Canada's successful role in the conflict gave Canada credibility and established it as a nation fighting for the "common good" of all nations. Canada participated in every UN peacekeeping effort from its inception until 1989. Since 1995, however, Canadian direct participation in UN peacekeeping efforts has greatly declined. In July 2006, for instance, Canada ranked 51st on the list of UN peacekeepers, contributing 130 peacekeepers out of a total UN deployment of over 70,000. Where in November 1990 Canada had 1,002 troops out of a total UN deployment of 10,304, that number decreased largely because Canada began to direct its participation to UN-sanctioned military operations through NATO, rather than directly to the UN.

Canadian Nobel Peace Prize laureate Lester B. Pearson is considered to be the father of modern peacekeeping. Pearson had become a very prominent figure in the United Nations during its infancy, and found himself in a peculiar position in 1956 during the Suez Crisis: Pearson and Canada found themselves stuck between a conflict of their closest allies, being looked upon to find a solution. During United Nations meetings Lester B. Pearson proposed to the security council that a United Nations police force be established to prevent further conflict in the region, allowing the countries involved an opportunity to sort out a resolution. Pearson's proposal and offer to dedicate 1,000 Canadian soldiers to that cause was seen as a brilliant political move that prevented another war.

The first Canadian peacekeeping mission, even before the creation of the formal UN system, was a 1948 mission to the second Kashmir conflict. Other important missions include those in Cyprus, Congo, Somalia, Yugoslav, and observation missions in the Sinai Peninsula and Golan Heights. The loss of nine Canadian peacekeepers when their Buffalo 461 was shot down over Syria in 1974 remains the largest single loss of life in Canadian peacekeeping history. In 1988, the Nobel Peace Prize was awarded to United Nations peacekeepers, inspiring the creation of the Canadian Peacekeeping Service Medal to recognize Canadians, including serving and former members of the Canadian Forces, members of the Royal Canadian Mounted Police, other police services, and civilians, who contributed to peace on certain missions.

See also 

 History of Canadian foreign policy
 List of Canadian military operations
 List of Canadian military victories
 List of Canadian Victoria Cross recipients
 List of conflicts in Canada
 List of French forts in North America
 List of wars involving Canada
 Military history of the Acadians
 Military history of the Mi'kmaq
 Military history of Nova Scotia

References

Further reading 

 
 Cook, Tim. Warlords: Borden, Mackenzie King and Canada's World Wars (2012) 472pp online, on the prime ministers in the world wars
 Douglas, W. A. B. The RCN in Transition, 1910–1985 (1988), Navy
 
  Granatstein, J. L., and Dean F. Oliver. The Oxford Companion to Canadian Military History, (2011) online review.
 
 
 Shaw, Susan Evans, and Jean Crankshaw. Canadians at War Vol. 1: A Guide to the Battlefields and Memorials of World War I; Vol. 2: A Guide to the Battlefields and Memorials of World War II (2014)
 
 

Historiography

 Douglas, W.A.B. "Marching to Different Drums: Canadian Military History", The Journal of Military History (1992) 56#2 pp 245–260.

External links 

 Canadian Military History Gateway – Government of Canada
 Canadian Military History – Library and Archives Canada
 Canadian Military History – Laurier Centre for Military Strategic and Disarmament Studies, Wilfrid Laurier University
 Canadian Military History
 War and the Foundation of Canada, Canadian War Museum
  War & Conflict at CBC Archives

 
Conflicts in Canada
Canadian Army
Canadian Militia
History of the Royal Canadian Navy
History of the Royal Canadian Air Force
War of 1812